

Deaths in November

 4: Matty Alou
 7: Joe Frazier
 19: Basil D'Oliveira
 25: Vasily Alekseyev
 27: Gary Speed

Current sporting seasons

American football 2011

National Football League
NCAA Division I FBS
NCAA Division I FCS

Auto racing 2011

Formula One
Sprint Cup
Nationwide Series
Camping World Truck Series
World Rally Championship
WTCC
V8 Supercar
GP2 Series
FIA GT1 World Championship
Super GT

Baseball 2011

Nippon Professional Baseball

Basketball 2011

NCAA Division I men
NCAA Division I women
Euroleague
EuroLeague Women
Eurocup
EuroChallenge
Australia
France
Germany
Greece
Israel
Italy
Philippines
Philippine Cup
Russia
Spain
Turkey

Canadian football 2011

Canadian Football League
CIS football

Cricket 2011

Australia:
Sheffield Shield
Ryobi One-Day Cup

Football (soccer) 2011

National teams competitions
2014 FIFA World Cup qualification
UEFA Euro 2012 qualifying
UEFA Women's Euro 2013 qualifying
International clubs competitions
UEFA (Europe) Champions League
UEFA Europa League
UEFA Women's Champions League
Copa Sudamericana
AFC (Asia) Champions League
CAF (Africa) Champions League
CAF Confederation Cup
CONCACAF (North & Central America) Champions League
OFC (Oceania) Champions League
Domestic (national) competitions
Argentina
Australia
Brazil
England
France
Germany
Iran
Italy
Japan
Norway
Portugal
Russia
Scotland
Spain
Major League Soccer (USA & Canada)
MLS Cup Playoffs

Golf 2011

PGA Tour
European Tour
LPGA Tour
Champions Tour

Ice hockey 2011

National Hockey League
Kontinental Hockey League
Czech Extraliga
Elitserien
Canadian Hockey League:
OHL, QMJHL, WHL
NCAA Division I men
NCAA Division I women

Motorcycle racing 2011

Moto GP

Rugby league 2011

Four Nations
Autumn International Series

Rugby union 2011

Heineken Cup
Amlin Challenge Cup
Aviva Premiership
RaboDirect Pro12
Top 14
LV= Cup
Sevens World Series

Snooker 2011

Players Tour Championship

Tennis 2011

ATP World Tour
WTA Tour

Volleyball 2011

International clubs competitions
Men's CEV Champions League
Women's CEV Champions League

Winter sports

Alpine Skiing World Cup
Biathlon World Cup
Cross-Country Skiing World Cup
ISU Grand Prix
ISU Junior Grand Prix
Luge World Cup
Nordic Combined World Cup
Short Track Speed Skating World Cup
Ski Jumping World Cup
Snowboard World Cup
Speed Skating World Cup

Days of the month

November 30, 2011 (Wednesday)

Baseball
Nippon Professional Baseball awards:
Rookies of the Year:
Central League: Hirokazu Sawamura, Yomiuri Giants
Pacific League: Kazuhisa Makita, Saitama Seibu Lions

Basketball
Euroleague Regular Season Matchday 7 (teams in bold qualify for Top 16):
Group A: Gescrap Bizkaia  97–76  SLUC Nancy
Standings:  Caja Laboral 4–2,  Olympiacos,  Bennet Cantù,  Fenerbahçe Ülker 3–3, Gescrap Bizkaia, SLUC Nancy 3–4.
Group B:
Žalgiris  67–65  Unicaja
Brose Baskets  78–81  CSKA Moscow
Panathinaikos  94–76  KK Zagreb
Standings: CSKA Moscow 7–0, Panathinaikos 5–2, Unicaja 3–4, Brose Baskets, Žalgiris, KK Zagreb 2–5.
Group C: Spirou Charleroi  62–66  Anadolu Efes
Standings:  Maccabi Tel Aviv 5–1,  Real Madrid 4–2, Anadolu Efes 4–3,  Partizan Mt:s Belgrade 3–3,  EA7 Emporio Armani 2–4, Spirou Charleroi 1–6.

Biathlon
World Cup 1 in Östersund, Sweden:
Men's 20 km Individual:  Martin Fourcade  53:29.8 (0+0+0+1)  Michal Šlesingr  55:24.1 (0+1+0+0)  Simon Schempp  55:24.3 (1+0+0+0)

Football (soccer)
CAF U-23 Championship in Morocco:
Group B in Marrakech:
 1–1 
 1–0 
Standings (after 2 matches): Côte d'Ivoire 4 points, Egypt 3, South Africa 2, Gabon 1.
UEFA Europa League group stage Matchday 5 (teams in bold qualify for Round of 32):
Group A:
Rubin Kazan  4–1  Shamrock Rovers
Tottenham Hotspur  1–2  P.A.O.K.
Standings (after 5 matches): P.A.O.K. 11 points, Rubin Kazan 10, Tottenham Hotspur 7, Shamrock Rovers 0.
Group B:
Standard Liège  2–0  Hannover 96
Vorskla Poltava  1–1  Copenhagen
Standings (after 5 matches): Standard Liège 11 points, Hannover 96 8, Copenhagen 5, Vorskla Poltava 2.
Group C:
Rapid București  1–3  Hapoel Tel Aviv
Legia Warsaw  0–3  PSV Eindhoven
Standings (after 5 matches): PSV Eindhoven 13 points, Legia Warsaw 9, Hapoel Tel Aviv 4, Rapid București 3.
Group G:
Malmö FF  0–0  AZ
Metalist Kharkiv  4–1  Austria Wien
Standings (after 5 matches): Metalist Kharkiv 13 points, AZ 7, Austria Wien 5, Malmö FF 1.
Group H:
Maribor  3–4  Club Brugge
Braga  1–0  Birmingham City
Standings (after 5 matches): Club Brugge, Braga 10 points, Birmingham City 7, Maribor 1.
Group I:
Rennes  0–0  Udinese
Celtic  0–1  Atlético Madrid
Standings (after 5 matches): Atlético Madrid 10 points, Udinese 8, Celtic 5, Rennes 3.
Copa Sudamericana Semifinals second leg (first leg score in parentheses): Universidad de Chile  2–0 (1–1)  Vasco da Gama. Universidad de Chile win 4–1 on points.

Snooker
Players Tour Championship – Event 10 in Sheffield, England:
Final: Michael Holt  4–2 Dominic Dale 
Holt wins his second professional title.
Order of Merit (after 10 of 12 events): (1) Ronnie O'Sullivan  29,600 (2) Judd Trump  28,900 (3) Neil Robertson  28,100

November 29, 2011 (Tuesday)

Baseball
Asia Series Final in Taichung, Taiwan:  Samsung Lions 5,  Fukuoka SoftBank Hawks 3.
The Lions become the first non-Japanese champion. Lions starting pitcher Jang Won-Sam is named series MVP.

Cricket
West Indies in India:
1st ODI in Cuttack:  211/9 (50 overs);  213/9 (48.5 overs). India win by 1 wicket, lead 5-match series 1–0.
Pakistan in Bangladesh:
Only T20I in Mirpur:  135/7 (20 overs);  85/9 (20 overs). Pakistan win by 50 runs.

Football (soccer)
CAF U-23 Championship in Morocco:
Group A in Tangiers:
 1–0 
 2–1 
Standings (after 2 matches): Morocco 6 points, Senegal, Algeria 3, Nigeria 0.
Copa Sudamericana Semifinals second leg (first leg score in parentheses): Vélez Sársfield  0–1 (0–2)  LDU Quito. LDU Quito win 6–0 on points.

Snooker
Ricky Walden compiles the 81st official maximum break at the Players Tour Championship – Event 10.

Volleyball
FIVB Men's World Cup in Japan, Matchday 8:
 3–0 
 0–3 
 0–3 
 1–3 
 1–3 
 3–1 
Standings (after 8 matches): Poland 22 points, Russia 21, Italy 17, Brazil 16, Cuba 14, Iran, United States 12, Argentina 9, Japan 8, Serbia 6, China 4, Egypt 3.

November 28, 2011 (Monday)

Volleyball
FIVB Men's World Cup in Japan, Matchday 7:
 3–0 
 3–0 
 3–0 
 0–3 
 3–2 
 1–3 
Standings (after 7 matches): Poland 19 points, Russia 18, Brazil 16, Italy, Cuba 14, Iran 12, United States, Argentina 9, Japan 8, Serbia, Egypt 3, China 1.

November 27, 2011 (Sunday)

Alpine skiing
Men's World Cup in Lake Louise, Canada:
Super Giant Slalom:  Aksel Lund Svindal  1:23.47  Didier Cuche  1:23.70  Adrien Théaux  1:24.11
Overall standings (after 3 of 45 races): (1) Cuche 180 points (2) Svindal 140 (3) Ted Ligety  & Théaux 100
Women's World Cup in Aspen, United States:
Slalom:  Marlies Schild  1:43.72 (51.24, 52.48)  Maria Pietilä Holmner  1:44.91 (52.07, 52.84)  Maria Höfl-Riesch  1:45.68 (52.27, 53.41)
Overall standings (after 3 of 40 races): (1) Viktoria Rebensburg  180 points (2) Elisabeth Görgl  140 (3) Pietilä Holmner 125

Auto racing
Formula One:
 in São Paulo, Brazil: (1) Mark Webber  (Red Bull-Renault) (2) Sebastian Vettel  (Red Bull-Renault) (3) Jenson Button  (McLaren-Mercedes)
Final drivers' championship standings: (1) Vettel 392 points (2) Button 270 (3) Webber 258

Badminton
BWF Super Series:
China Open Super Series Premier in Shanghai (CHN unless stated):
Men's singles: Lin Dan def. Chen Long 21–17, 26–24
Women's singles: Wang Yihan def. Wang Xin 18–12 retired
Men's doubles: Mathias Boe/Carsten Mogensen  def. Ko Sung-hyun/Yoo Yeon-seong  21–17, 21–13
Women's doubles: Wang Xiaoli/Yu Yang def. Tang Jinhua/Xia Huan 21–11, 21–10
Mixed doubles: Zhang Nan/Zhao Yunlei def. Joachim Fischer Nielsen/Christinna Pedersen  21–11, 21–14

Baseball
Asia Series in Taiwan (teams in bold qualify for Final):
 Fukuoka SoftBank Hawks 4,  Perth Heat 0
 Samsung Lions 6,  Uni-President 7-Eleven Lions 3
Final standings: Fukuoka SoftBank Hawks 3–0, Samsung Lions 2–1, Uni-President 7-Eleven Lions 1–2, Perth Heat 0–3.

Canadian football
CFL Playoffs:
Grey Cup in Vancouver, British Columbia: BC Lions 34, Winnipeg Blue Bombers 23
The Lions win the Cup for the sixth time.

Cross-country skiing
World Cup in Kuusamo, Finland:
Men's 15 km C Handicap Start:  Alexey Poltoranin  37:42.8  Eldar Rønning  37:51.5  Daniel Richardsson  38:11.3
Final Nordic Opening standings:  Petter Northug  1:03:05.1  Dario Cologna  1:03:06.9  Rønning 1:03:25.7
Distance standings (after 3 of 22 races): (1) Johan Olsson  169 points (2) Northug 140 (3) Roland Clara  109
Overall standings (after 5 of 38 races): (1) Northug 355 points (2) Cologna 278 (3) Olsson 259
Women's 10 km C Handicap Start (all NOR):  Therese Johaug 27:51.4  Marit Bjørgen 28:00.1  Vibeke Skofterud 28:16.4
Final Nordic Opening standings:  Bjørgen 41:36.6  Johaug 42:09.6  Skofterud 42:10.3
Distance standings (after 3 of 22 races): (1) Bjørgen 196 points (2) Charlotte Kalla  156 (3) Skofterud 146
Overall standings (after 5 of 38 races): (1) Bjørgen 446 points (2) Johaug 316 (3) Skofterud 309

Football (soccer)
CAF U-23 Championship in Morocco:
Group B in Marrakech:
 1–0 
 1–1 
2012 Olympics Men's Asian Qualifiers Preliminary Round 3, Matchday 3:
Group A:
 1–0 
 1–1 
Standings (after 3 matches): South Korea 7 points, Oman 4, Qatar 3, Saudi Arabia 1.
Group B:
 0–0 
 0–2 
Standings (after 3 matches): Uzbekistan 5 points, Iraq 4, Australia 3, United Arab Emirates 2.
Group C:
 2–1 
 2–3 
Standings (after 3 matches): Japan 9 points, Syria 6, Bahrain 3, Malaysia 0.

Golf
Omega Mission Hills World Cup in Haikou, China:
Winners:  (Matt Kuchar, Gary Woodland) 264 (−24)
The United States win the Cup for the 24th time.
European Tour:
South African Open in Ekurhuleni, South Africa:
Winner: Hennie Otto  274 (−14)
Otto wins his second European Tour title.

Luge
World Cup 1 in Igls, Austria:
Men's singles:  Felix Loch  1:40.270 (50.145, 50.125)  David Möller  1:40.573 (50.244, 50.329)  Armin Zöggeler  1:40.627 (50.305, 50.322)
Team relay:   (Alex Gough, Samuel Edney, Tristan Walker/Justin Snith) 2:08.774 (41.302, 43.575, 43.897)   (Tatjana Hüfner, Andi Langenhan, Tobias Arlt/Tobias Wendl) 2:08.991 (41.190, 43.695, 44.106)   (Tatiana Ivanova, Albert Demtschenko, Vladislav Yuzhakov/Vladimir Makhnutin) 2:09.427 (41.575, 43.920, 43.932)

Ski jumping
Men's World Cup in Kuusamo, Finland:
HS 142 Team:   (Wolfgang Loitzl, Andreas Kofler, Gregor Schlierenzauer, Thomas Morgenstern) 517.2 points   (Junshiro Kobayashi, Shōhei Tochimoto, Taku Takeuchi, Daiki Ito) 408.4   (Dimitry Vassiliev, Anton Kalinitschenko, Roman Sergeevich Trofimov, Denis Kornilov) 398.3
HS 142:  Kofler 264.2 points  Schlierenzauer 263.5  Morgenstern 256.3

Speed skating
World Cup 2 in Astana, Kazakhstan:
Men's 1000m:  Stefan Groothuis  1:08.85  Kjeld Nuis  1:08.92  Mo Tae-Bum  1:09.29
Standings (after 2 of 6 races): (1) Groothuis 200 points (2) Nuis 160 (3) Denny Morrison  120
Men's mass start:  Lee Seung-Hoon  9:40.51  Jonathan Kuck  9:40.67  Joo Hyung-Joon  9:40.81
Women's 1000m:  Christine Nesbitt  1:14.82  Thijsje Oenema  1:16.12(0)  Margot Boer  1:16.12(7)
Standings (after 2 of 6 races): (1) Nesbitt 200 points (2) Boer 150 (3) Marrit Leenstra  130
Women's mass start:  Mariska Huisman  7:26.53  Claudia Pechstein  7:26.61  Kim Bo-Reum  7:26.85

Snooker
David Gray compiles the 80th official maximum break at the Players Tour Championship – Event 10 and becomes the 13th person to compile more than one.

Tennis
ATP World Tour:
ATP World Tour Finals in London, England:
Final: Roger Federer  def. Jo-Wilfried Tsonga  6–3, 6–7(6), 6–3
Federer wins the year-end championships for a record sixth time. He wins his fourth title of the year, and in his 100th career final, his 70th title.

Volleyball
FIVB Men's World Cup in Japan, Matchday 6:
 0–3 
 3–1 
 3–1 
 0–3 
 0–3 
 3–1 
Standings (after 6 matches): Poland 16 points, Russia, Brazil 15, Cuba 12, Italy 11, Iran, United States, Argentina 9, Japan 5, Serbia, Egypt 3, China 1.

November 26, 2011 (Saturday)

Alpine skiing
Men's World Cup in Lake Louise, Canada:
Downhill:  Didier Cuche  1:47.28  Beat Feuz  1:47.34  Hannes Reichelt  1:47.36
Overall standings (after 2 of 45 races): (1) Cuche & Ted Ligety  100 points (3) Feuz & Alexis Pinturault  80
Women's World Cup in Aspen, United States:
Giant Slalom:  Viktoria Rebensburg  2:11.25 (1:05.41, 1:05.84)  Elisabeth Görgl  2:11.58 (1:04.46, 1:07.12)  Julia Mancuso  2:11.69 (1:05.37, 1:06.32)
Giant slalom standings (after 2 of 9 races) & Overall standings (after 2 of 40 races): (1) Rebensburg 180 points (2) Görgl 140 (3) Lindsey Vonn  122

Baseball
Asia Series in Taiwan:
 Fukuoka SoftBank Hawks 9,  Samsung Lions 0
 Uni-President 7-Eleven Lions 3,  Perth Heat 2 (F/10)
Standings: Fukuoka SoftBank Hawks 2–0, Samsung Lions, Uni-President 7-Eleven Lions 1–1, Perth Heat 0–2.

Cricket
West Indies in India:
3rd Test in Mumbai, day 5:  590 & 134 (57.2 overs; Pragyan Ojha 6/47);  482 & 242/9 (64 overs). Match drawn; India win 3-match series 2–0.
The match becomes the second in Test history to end in a draw with the scores level.

Cross-country skiing
World Cup in Kuusamo, Finland:
Men's 10 km F Individual:  Petter Northug  24:23.6  Dario Cologna  24:35.4  Alexander Legkov  25:05.0
Distance standings (after 2 of 22 races): (1) Johan Olsson  132 points (2) Northug 130 (3) Roland Clara  106
Overall standings (after 3 of 38 races): (1) Northug 145 points (2) Olsson 132 (3) Clara 106
Women's 5 km F Individual:  Marit Bjørgen  13:36.5  Vibeke Skofterud  13:53.9  Charlotte Kalla  13:56.6
Distance standings (after 2 of 22 races): (1) Bjørgen 150 points (2) Kalla 126 (3) Skofterud 103
Overall standings (after 3 of 38 races): (1) Bjørgen 200 points (2) Kalla 172 (3) Skofterud 146

Curling
Pacific-Asia Championships in Nanjing, China:
Men:
Bronze Final:  2–9  
Final:   5–2  
China win the title for the fifth time.
Women:
Bronze Final:   8–4 
Final:   3–11  
China win the title for the fifth time in six years.

Equestrianism
Show jumping – Global Champions Tour:
10th Competition in Abu Dhabi, United Arab Emirates (CSI 5*):  Roger-Yves Bost  on Ideal de la Loge  Khaled Al-Eid  on Presley Boy  Álvaro de Miranda Neto  on Ashleigh Drossel Dan
Final standings: (1) Edwina Tops-Alexander  238 points (2) Ludger Beerbaum  218.5 (3) de Miranda Neto 210

Figure skating
ISU Grand Prix:
Rostelecom Cup in Moscow, Russia (skaters in bold qualify for Final):
Ladies:  Mao Asada  183.25 points  Alena Leonova  180.45  Adelina Sotnikova  169.75
Final standings: Elizaveta Tuktamysheva  30 points, Asada, Carolina Kostner  & Akiko Suzuki  28, Alissa Czisny  26, Leonova 24.
Pairs:  Aliona Savchenko/Robin Szolkowy  208.69 points  Yuko Kavaguti/Alexander Smirnov  197.84  Stefania Berton/Ondřej Hotárek  168.02
Final standings: Tatiana Volosozhar/Maxim Trankov , Savchenko/Szolkowy & Kavaguti/Smirnov 30 points, Zhang Dan/Zhang Hao  26, Narumi Takahashi/Mervin Tran , Meagan Duhamel/Eric Radford  & Kirsten Moore-Towers/Dylan Moscovitch  22.
Men:  Yuzuru Hanyu  241.66 points  Javier Fernández  241.63  Jeremy Abbott  229.08
Final standings: Patrick Chan  30 points, Daisuke Takahashi , Abbott, Michal Březina  & Fernández 26, Hanyu, Song Nan  & Takahiko Kozuka  24.
Ice dance:  Meryl Davis/Charlie White  179.06 points  Kaitlyn Weaver/Andrew Poje  161.18  Ekaterina Bobrova/Dmitri Soloviev  156.83
Final standings: Davis/White & Tessa Virtue/Scott Moir  30 points, Maia Shibutani/Alex Shibutani  28, Bobrova/Soloviev, Nathalie Péchalat/Fabian Bourzat  & Weaver/Poje 26.

Football (soccer)
FIFA World Cup qualification – OFC First Round in Apia, Samoa (team in bold qualify for the Second Round):
 1–0 
 2–1 
Final standings: Samoa 7 points, Tonga, American Samoa 4, Cook Islands 1.
CAF U-23 Championship in Morocco:
Group A in Tangiers:
 0–1 
 1–0

Luge
World Cup 1 in Igls, Austria:
Women's singles:  Tatjana Hüfner  1:19.353 (39.717, 39.636)  Anke Wischnewski  1:19.554 (39.735, 39.819)  Alex Gough  1:19.628 (39.861, 39.767)
Doubles:  Peter Penz/Georg Fischler  1:19.099 (39.486, 39.613)  Vladislav Yuzhakov/Vladimir Makhnutin  1:19.175 (39.543, 39.632)  Andreas Linger/Wolfgang Linger  1:19.187 (39.664, 39.523)

Nordic combined
World Cup in Kuusamo, Finland:
HS 142 / 10 km:  Tino Edelmann  27:37.3  Janne Ryynänen  27:45.3  Akito Watabe  27:49.5
Standings (after 2 of 23 races): (1) Edelmann 160 points (2) Magnus Krog  & Watabe 140

Rugby union
IRB Sevens World Series:
Gold Coast Sevens in Gold Coast, Australia:
Shield:  19–31 
Bowl:  17–14 
Plate:  15–26 
Cup:  12–26 
End of year tests in London: Barbarians 11–60

Ski jumping
Men's World Cup in Kuusamo, Finland:
HS 142 Team: Postponed to November 27 due to strong winds.

Speed skating
World Cup 2 in Astana, Kazakhstan:
Men's 500m:  Jan Smeekens  35.05  Mo Tae-Bum  35.06  Tucker Fredricks  35.19
Standings (after 4 of 12 races): (1) Mo 285 points (2) Smeekens 246 (3) Joji Kato  213
Men's 5000m:  Sven Kramer  6:13.83  Jorrit Bergsma  6:15.40  Alexis Contin  6:17.43
Standings (after 2 of 6 races): (1) Kramer & Bergsma 180 points (3) Contin 120
Women's 500m:  Jenny Wolf  37.98(4)  Lee Sang-Hwa  37.98(5)  Nao Kodaira  37.99
Standings (after 4 of 12 races): (1) Lee 310 points (2) Wolf 290 (3) Thijsje Oenema  250
Women's 1500m:  Christine Nesbitt  1:56.10  Claudia Pechstein  1:56.77  Ireen Wüst  1:57.00
Standings (after 2 of 6 races): (1) Nesbitt 180 points (2) Wüst 170 (3) Pechstein 116

November 25, 2011 (Friday)

Baseball
Asia Series in Taiwan:
 Samsung Lions 10,  Perth Heat 2
 Fukuoka SoftBank Hawks 6,  Uni-President 7-Eleven Lions 5

Canadian football
Vanier Cup in Vancouver: McMaster Marauders 41, Laval Rouge et Or 38 (2OT)
McMaster win the Cup for the first time.

Cricket
West Indies in India:
3rd Test in Mumbai, day 4:  590 & 81/2 (34 overs);  482 (135.4 overs; Ravichandran Ashwin 103). West Indies lead by 189 runs with 8 wickets remaining.
Ashwin becomes the first player to score a century and record five wickets in an innings, since Jacques Kallis  in 2002.
Pakistan vs Sri Lanka in UAE:
Only T20I in Abu Dhabi:  141 (19.3 overs);  142/5 (19.3 overs). Pakistan win by 5 wickets.

Cross-country skiing
World Cup in Kuusamo, Finland:
Men's Sprint C:  Teodor Peterson  2:50.7  Nikita Kriukov  2:51.2  Øystein Pettersen  2:51.7
Overall standings (after 2 of 38 races): (1) Johan Olsson  100 points (2) Petter Northug  95 (3) Roland Clara  & Dario Cologna  60
Women's Sprint C:  Marit Bjørgen  2:50.1  Charlotte Kalla  2:52.2  Vibeke Skofterud  2:54.0
Overall standings (after 2 of 38 races): (1) Bjørgen 150 points (2) Kalla 126 (3) Skofterud 103

Curling
Pacific-Asia Championships in Nanjing, China:
Men's Semifinals: (the winners qualify for 2012 Capital One World Men's Curling Championship)
Game 3:
 3–7 . China win series 3–0.
 2–8 . New Zealand lead series 2–1.
Game 4:  5–7 . New Zealand win series 3–1.
Women's Semifinals: (the winners qualify for 2012 Ford World Women's Curling Championship)
Game 3:
 3–10 . South Korea win series 3–0.
 2–10 . China win series 3–0.

Nordic combined
World Cup in Kuusamo, Finland:
HS 142 / 10 km:  Magnus Krog  27:41.0  Akito Watabe  27:43.5  Tino Edelmann  27:48.1

Speed skating
World Cup 2 in Astana, Kazakhstan:
Men's 500m:  Mo Tae-Bum  34.89  Tucker Fredricks  34.94  Stefan Groothuis  35.01
Standings (after 3 of 12 races): (1) Mo 205 points (2) Yūya Oikawa  190 (3) Joji Kato  177
Men's 1500m:  Wouter olde Heuvel  1:45.69  Denny Morrison  1:45.80  Håvard Bøkko  1:45.97
Standings (after 2 of 6 races): (1) Groothuis 145 points (2) Shani Davis  140 (3) olde Heuvel 136
Women's 500m:  Lee Sang-Hwa  37.78  Jenny Wolf  38.04  Thijsje Oenema  38.22
Standings (after 3 of 12 races): (1) Lee 230 points (2) Oenema 210 (3) Yu Jing  200
Women's 3000m:  Martina Sáblíková  4:03.28  Claudia Pechstein  4:03.59  Diane Valkenburg  4:05.36
Standings (after 2 of 6 races): (1) Sáblíková 200 points (2) Pechstein 150 (3) Ireen Wüst  140

Volleyball
FIVB Men's World Cup in Japan, Matchday 5:
 3–2 
 3–1 
 1–3 
 3–1 
 2–3 
 1–3 
Standings (after 5 matches): Poland 13 points, Russia, Brazil 12, Italy 11, Iran, Cuba, Argentina 9, United States 6, Serbia, Egypt 3, Japan 2, China 1.

November 24, 2011 (Thursday)

Basketball
Euroleague Regular Season Matchday 6 (teams in bold qualify for Top 16):
Group A:
SLUC Nancy  76–75  Bennet Cantù
Caja Laboral  90–85 (OT)  Fenerbahçe Ülker
Standings: Caja Laboral 4–2,  Olympiacos, Bennet Cantù, Fenerbahçe Ülker, SLUC Nancy 3–3,  Gescrap Bizkaia 2–4.
Group B:
Unicaja  76–77  Panathinaikos
KK Zagreb  86–74  Brose Baskets
Standings:  CSKA Moscow 6–0, Panathinaikos 4–2, Unicaja 3–3, Brose Baskets, KK Zagreb 2–4,  Žalgiris Kaunas 1–5.
Group C:
Real Madrid  93–89  Spirou Charleroi
Maccabi Tel Aviv  85–76  EA7 Emporio Armani
Standings: Maccabi Tel Aviv 5–1, Real Madrid 4–2,  Anadolu Efes,  Partizan Mt:s Belgrade 3–3, EA7 Emporio Armani 2–4, Spirou Basket 1–5.
Group D:
Galatasaray Medical Park  78–76 (OT)  Asseco Prokom Gdynia
FC Barcelona Regal  72–46  Union Olimpija Ljubljana
With 14 points during the game, FC Barcelona Regal's Juan Carlos Navarro  becomes the all-time Euroleague points-scoring leader, surpassing the mark of Marcus Brown .
Standings: FC Barcelona Regal 6–0,  Montepaschi Siena,  UNICS Kazan 4–2, Galatasaray Medical Park 3–3, Union Olimpija Ljubljana 1–5, Asseco Prokom Gdynia 0–6.

Chess
Women's World Championship in Tirana, Albania:
Game 8: Koneru Humpy  ½–½ Hou Yifan . Hou wins series 5½–2½.
Hou retains her title.

Cricket
West Indies in India:
3rd Test in Mumbai, day 3:  590 (184.1 overs; Ravichandran Ashwin 5/156);  281/3 (80 overs). India trail by 309 runs with 7 wickets remaining in the 1st innings.

Curling
Pacific-Asia Championships in Nanjing, China:
Men (teams in bold advance to the playoffs):
Draw 10:
 7–8 
 5–2 
 6–5 
Final standings: China 9–1, South Korea 7–3, New Zealand, Australia 5–5, Chinese Taipei 3–7, Japan 1–9.
Women:
Draw 6:
 9–1 
 7–6 
Final standings: China, South Korea 5–1, Japan 2–4, New Zealand 0–6.

Football (soccer)
FIFA World Cup qualification – OFC First Round in Apia, Samoa:
 1–1 
 1–1 
Standings (after 2 matches): Samoa, American Samoa 4 points, Cook Islands, Tonga 1.
UEFA Women's Euro 2013 qualifying Matchday 6:
Group 2:
 8–1 
 2–2 
Standings (after 6 matches unless stated): Spain 13 points (5 matches), Germany 10 (4),  9, Switzerland 6 (4), Kazakhstan 4,  1 (5).
Group 5:  0–1 
Standings (after 3 matches unless stated):  7 points, Belarus 7 (4),  4 (2), Ukraine 4,  0 (4).
Group 6:  2–0 
Standings (after 4 matches unless stated): Netherlands 13 points (5 matches),  8,  7 (5), Croatia,  1.
Copa Sudamericana Semifinals first leg: LDU Quito  2–0  Vélez Sársfield

Volleyball
FIVB Men's World Cup in Japan, Matchday 4:
 3–1 
 2–3 
 3–2 
 0–3 
 3–0 
 3–0 
Standings (after 4 matches): Brazil, Poland 10 points, Russia 9, Italy, Argentina 8, Iran 7, United States, Cuba 6, Serbia, Egypt 3, Japan 2, China 0.

November 23, 2011 (Wednesday)

Basketball
Euroleague Regular Season Matchday 6 (team in bold qualify for Top 16):
Group A: Olympiacos  88–81  Gescrap Bizkaia
Standings:  Caja Laboral,  Bennet Cantù,  Fenerbahçe Ülker 3–2, Olympiacos 3–3,  SLUC Nancy 2–3, Gescrap Bizkaia 2–4.
Group B: CSKA Moscow  95–82  Žalgiris
Standings: CSKA Moscow 6–0,  Panathinaikos,  Unicaja 3–2,  Brose Baskets 2–3,  KK Zagreb 1–4, Žalgiris 1–5.
Group C: Anadolu Efes  67–58  Partizan Mt:s Belgrade
Standings:  Maccabi Tel Aviv 4–1,  Real Madrid 3–2, Anadolu Efes, Partizan Mt:s Belgrade 3–3,  EA7 Emporio Armani 2–3,  Spirou Charleroi 1–4.
Group D: Montepaschi Siena  73–79  UNICS Kazan
Standings:  FC Barcelona Regal 5–0, Montepaschi Siena, UNICS Kazan 4–2,  Galatasaray Medical Park 2–3,  Union Olimpija Ljubljana 1–4,  Asseco Prokom Gdynia 0–5.

Chess
Women's World Championship in Tirana, Albania:
Game 7: Hou Yifan  1–0 Koneru Humpy . Hou leads series 5–2.

Cricket
West Indies in India:
3rd Test in Mumbai, day 2:  575/9 (181 overs; Darren Bravo 166); .
Pakistan vs Sri Lanka in UAE:
5th ODI in Abu Dhabi:  218/9 (50 overs);  219/7 (47.2 overs). Pakistan win by 3 wickets; win 5-match series 4–1.

Curling
Pacific-Asia Championships in Nanjing, China:
Men: (teams in bold advance to the playoffs)
Draw 8:
 7–2 
 5–9 
 4–3 
Draw 9:
 8–12 
 8–5 
 5–8 
Standings: China 8–1, South Korea 7–2, New Zealand, Australia 4–5, Chinese Taipei 3–6, Japan 1–8.
Women:
Draw 5:
 7–5 
 8–3 
Standings: China, South Korea 4–1, Japan 2–3, New Zealand 0–5.

Football (soccer)
UEFA Women's Euro 2013 qualifying Matchday 6:
Group 1:
 0–3 
 2–0 
Standings (after 4 matches unless stated): Italy 15 points (5 matches),  9, Poland 9 (5),  3, Greece, Macedonia 1.
Group 2:  1–2 
Standings (after 5 matches unless stated):  12 points (4 matches),  9 (3), Romania 9 (6),  4,  3 (3), Turkey 1.
Group 3:
 0–1 
 2–2 
Standings (after 5 matches unless stated):  13 points, Belgium 10, Northern Ireland 7 (4),  6 (4), Hungary 4, Bulgaria 0.
Group 6:  2–0 
Standings (after 3 matches unless stated): England 8 points (4 matches),  7 (3), Serbia 4 (4),  1 (2),  1.
Group 7:  11–0 
Standings (after 4 matches unless stated): Denmark 12 points,  7 (3),  7,  3, Armenia 0 (5).
2012 Olympics Men's Asian Qualifiers Preliminary Round 3, Matchday 2:
Group A:
 1–1 
 2–0 
Standings (after 2 matches): South Korea 4 points, Oman 3, Qatar 2, Saudi Arabia 1.
Group B:  0–0 
Standings (after 2 matches): Uzbekistan 4 points, United Arab Emirates 2,  1.
Group C:  0–2 
Standings (after 2 matches): Syria,  6 points, Malaysia 0.
UEFA Champions League group stage Matchday 5 (teams in bold qualify for Round of 16):
Group E:
Bayer Leverkusen  2–1  Chelsea
Valencia  7–0  Genk
Standings (after 5 matches): Bayer Leverkusen 9 points, Chelsea, Valencia 8, Genk 2.
Group F:
Marseille  0–1  Olympiacos
Arsenal  2–1  Borussia Dortmund
Standings (after 5 matches): Arsenal 11 points, Marseille 7, Olympiacos 6, Borussia Dortmund 4.
Group G:
Zenit St. Petersburg  0–0  APOEL
Shakhtar Donetsk  0–2  Porto
Standings (after 5 matches): APOEL 9 points, Zenit St. Petersburg 8, Porto 7, Shakhtar Donetsk 2.
APOEL become the first Cypriot team to reach the last 16 of the Champions League.
Group H:
BATE Borisov  0–1  Viktoria Plzeň
Milan  2–3  Barcelona
Standings (after 5 matches): Barcelona 13 points, Milan 8, Viktoria Plzeň 4, BATE Borisov 2.
Copa Sudamericana Semifinals first leg: Vasco da Gama  1–1  Universidad de Chile

November 22, 2011 (Tuesday)

Baseball
Major League Baseball awards:
National League Most Valuable Player: Ryan Braun, Milwaukee Brewers

Cricket
West Indies in India:
3rd Test in Mumbai, day 1:  267/2 (91 overs); .

Curling
Pacific-Asia Championships in Nanjing, China:
Men: (teams in bold advance to the playoffs)
Draw 6:
 6–2 
 5–6 
 6–8 
Draw 7:
 9–6 
 8–6 
 6–4 
Standings: China, South Korea 6–1, Chinese Taipei, New Zealand 3–4, Australia 2–5, Japan 1–6.
Women:
Draw 4:
 9–1 
 9–7 
Standings: China, South Korea 3–1, Japan 2–2, New Zealand 0–4.

Football (soccer)
FIFA World Cup qualification – OFC First Round in Apia, Samoa:
 2–1 
American Samoa win their first game as a member of FIFA.
 2–3 
2012 Olympics Men's Asian Qualifiers Preliminary Round 3, Matchday 2:
Group B:  0–0 
Standings:  3 points (1 match), Australia 2 (2),  1 (1), Iraq 1 (2).
Group C:  0–2 
Standings: Japan 6 points (2 matches),  3 (1), Bahrain 0 (2),  0 (1).
UEFA Champions League group stage Matchday 5 (teams in bold qualify for Round of 16):
Group A:
Napoli  2–1  Manchester City
Bayern Munich  3–1  Villarreal
Standings (after 5 matches): Bayern Munich 13 points, Napoli 8, Manchester City 7, Villarreal 0.
Group B:
CSKA Moscow  0–2  Lille
Trabzonspor  1–1  Internazionale
Standings (after 5 matches): Internazionale 10 points, Trabzonspor 6, Lille, CSKA Moscow 5.
Group C:
Oțelul Galați  2–3  Basel
Manchester United  2–2  Benfica
Standings (after 5 matches): Benfica, Manchester United 9 points, Basel 8, Oțelul Galați 0.
Group D:
Real Madrid  6–2  Dinamo Zagreb
Lyon  0–0  Ajax
Standings (after 5 matches): Real Madrid 15 points, Ajax 8, Lyon 5, Dinamo Zagreb 0.

Snooker
Mike Dunn compiles the 79th official maximum break at the qualifying stages of the 2012 German Masters.

Volleyball
FIVB Men's World Cup in Japan, Matchday 3:
 3–2 
 3–1 
 0–3 
 0–3 
 3–2 
 0–3 
Standings (after 3 matches): Russia, Poland 9 points, Brazil 7, Cuba 6, Argentina, Italy, Iran 5, United States, Egypt 3, Japan, Serbia 1, China 0.

November 21, 2011 (Monday)

Baseball
Major League Baseball awards:
American League Most Valuable Player: Justin Verlander, Detroit Tigers

Chess
Women's World Championship in Tirana, Albania:
Game 6: Koneru Humpy  0–1 Hou Yifan . Hou leads series 4–2.

Cricket
Australia in South Africa:
2nd Test in Johannesburg, day 5:  266 & 339;  296 & 310/8 (86.5 overs; Vernon Philander 5/70). Australia win by 2 wickets; 2-match series drawn 1–1.

Curling
Pacific-Asia Championships in Nanjing, China:
Men:
Draw 4:
 10–4 
 10–2 
 8–3 
Draw 5:
 8–5 
 6–4 
 9–1 
Standings: South Korea 5–0, China 4–1, Chinese Taipei, Australia, New Zealand 2–3, Japan 0–5.
Women:
Draw 3:
 4–8 
 3–9 
Standings: South Korea 3–0, China 2–1, Japan 1–2, New Zealand 0–3.

Volleyball
FIVB Men's World Cup in Japan, Matchday 2:
 3–0 
 1–3 
 3–2 
 0–3 
 3–1 
 3–0 
Standings (after 2 matches): Brazil, Russia, Poland 6 points, Argentina 5, Italy, United States, Cuba, Iran 3, Japan 1, Serbia, China, Egypt 0.

November 20, 2011 (Sunday)

Auto racing
Sprint Cup Series – Chase for the Sprint Cup:
Ford 400 in Homestead, Florida: (1)  Tony Stewart (Chevrolet; Stewart Haas Racing) (2)  Carl Edwards (Ford; Roush Fenway Racing) (3)  Martin Truex Jr. (Toyota; Michael Waltrip Racing)
Final drivers' championship standings: (1) Stewart 2403 points (5 wins) (2) Edwards 2403 (1 win) (3)  Kevin Harvick (Chevrolet; Richard Childress Racing) 2345
Stewart wins his third Cup title, and becomes the first owner-driver to win a championship since Alan Kulwicki in 1992.
V8 Supercars:
Norton 360 Sandown Challenge in Melbourne, Victoria (all AUS):
Race 26: (1) Jamie Whincup (Triple Eight Race Engineering; Holden VE Commodore) (2) Mark Winterbottom (Ford Performance Racing; Ford FG Falcon) (3) Will Davison (Ford Performance Racing; Ford FG Falcon)
Drivers' championship standings (after 26 of 28 races): (1) Whincup 3033 points (2) Craig Lowndes (Triple Eight Race Engineering; Holden VE Commodore) 2845 (3) Winterbottom 2449
World Touring Car Championship:
Race of Macau in Macau:
Race 1: (1) Robert Huff  (Chevrolet; Chevrolet Cruze) (2) Yvan Muller  (Chevrolet; Chevrolet Cruze) (3) Gabriele Tarquini  (Lukoil – SUNRED; SEAT León)
Race 2: (1) Huff (2) Tom Coronel  (ROAL Motorsport; BMW 320 TC) (3) Muller
Final drivers' championship standings: (1) Muller 433 points (2) Huff 430 (3) Alain Menu  (Chevrolet; Chevrolet Cruze) 323
Muller wins his third world title.

Badminton
BWF Super Series:
Hong Kong Super Series in Hong Kong (CHN unless stated):
Men's singles: Lin Dan def. Chen Jin 21–12, 21–19
Women's singles: Wang Xin def. Tine Baun  21–17, 21–14
Men's doubles: Cai Yun/Fu Haifeng def. Jung Jae-sung/Lee Yong-dae  14–21, 24–22, 21–19
Women's doubles: Wang Xiaoli/Yu Yang def. Tian Qing/Zhao Yunlei 21–12, 14–2 retired
Mixed doubles: Zhang Nan/Zhao def. Joachim Fischer Nielsen/Christinna Pedersen  15–21, 21–17, 21–17

Baseball
Japan Series, Game 7 in Fukuoka: Fukuoka SoftBank Hawks 3, Chunichi Dragons 0. Hawks win series 4–3.
The Hawks win the Japan Series for the first time since 2003, and the fifth time overall. Hawks first baseman Hiroki Kokubo is named series MVP.

Canadian football
CFL Playoffs:
Division Finals:
East in Winnipeg, Manitoba: Winnipeg Blue Bombers 19, Hamilton Tiger-Cats 3
West in Vancouver, British Columbia: BC Lions 40, Edmonton Eskimos 23

Chess
Women's World Championship in Tirana, Albania:
Game 5: Hou Yifan  ½–½ Koneru Humpy . Hou leads series 3–2.

Cricket
Australia in South Africa:
2nd Test in Johannesburg, day 4:  266 & 339 (110 overs; Hashim Amla 105, Pat Cummins 6/79);  296 & 142/3 (37 overs). Australia require another 168 runs with 7 wickets remaining.
Pakistan vs Sri Lanka in UAE:
4th ODI in Sharjah:  200 (49.3 overs);  174 (45.2 overs; Shahid Afridi 5/35). Pakistan win by 26 runs; lead 5-match series 3–1.

Cross-country skiing
World Cup in Sjusjøen, Norway:
Women's 4 × 5 km relay:   I (Vibeke Skofterud, Therese Johaug, Kristin Størmer Steira, Marit Bjørgen) 51:50.1   II (Astrid Uhrenholdt Jacobsen, Ingvild Flugstad Østberg, Tora Berger, Marthe Kristoffersen) 52:16.1   (Krista Lähteenmäki, Aino-Kaisa Saarinen, Riitta-Liisa Roponen, Riikka Sarasoja-Lilja) 52:29.2
Men's 4 x 10 km relay:   I (Eldar Rønning, Finn Hågen Krogh, Lars Berger, Petter Northug) 1:35:24.8   III (John Kristian Dahl, Ronny Ansnes, Morten Eilifsen, Sjur Røthe) 1:35:25.6   (Marcus Hellner, Daniel Richardsson, Johan Olsson, Calle Halfvarsson) 1:35:25.9

Curling
Pacific-Asia Championships in Nanjing, China:
Men:
Draw 2:
 8–7 
 1–6 
 9–7 
Draw 3:
 5–3 
 6–8 
 9–6 
Standings: South Korea 3–0, Australia, China 2–1, Chinese Taipei, New Zealand 1–2, Japan 0–3.
Women:
Draw 2:
 1–11 
 3–12 
Standings: South Korea 2–0, China, Japan 1–1, New Zealand 0–2.

Football (soccer)
UEFA Women's Euro 2013 qualifying Matchday 5:
Group 2:  0–4 
Standings (after 3 matches unless stated): Spain 12 points (4 matches),  9, Romania 6,  4 (5),  3,  1 (4).
Group 4:  0–2 
Standings (after 4 matches unless stated):  12 points,  6 (3),  4 (2), Wales 4, Israel 0 (5).
Group 7:  5–0 
Standings (after 4 matches unless stated):  9 points (3 matches), Czech Republic 7 (3),  7,  3, Armenia 0.
OFC Champions League group stage Matchday 2:
Group A: Waitakere United  4–0  Ba
Standings (after 2 matches): Waitakere United 6 points, Ba 3,  Mont-Dore,  Tefana 1.
 MLS Cup Final in Carson, California: Houston Dynamo 0–1 Los Angeles Galaxy

Golf
European Tour:
Iskandar Johor Open in Johor Bahru, Malaysia:
Winner: Joost Luiten  198 (−15)
Luiten wins his first European Tour title.
Alfred Dunhill Championship in Malalane, South Africa:
Winner: Garth Mulroy  269 (−19)
Mulroy wins his first European Tour title.
LPGA Tour:
CME Group Titleholders in Orlando, Florida:
Winner: Hee Young Park  279 (−9)
Park wins her first LPGA Tour title.
Presidents Cup in Melbourne, Australia: Internationals 15–19 United States
The United States win the Cup for the fourth successive time.

Gymnastics
Trampoline World Championships in Birmingham, England:
Double Mini Trampoline Individual men:  Bruno Martini  73.300 points  Austin White  72.800  Evgeny Chernoivanov  71.800
Double Mini Trampoline Individual women:  Svetlana Balandina  70.200 points  Bianca Zoonekynd  69.700  Victoria Voronina  68.700
Tumbling Individual men:  Yang Song  79.100 points  Zhang Luo  76.500  Andrey Krylov  75.800
Tumbling Individual women:  Jia Fangfang  71.700 points  Anna Korobeynikova  70.900  Anzhelika Soldatkina  68.400
Synchronised men:  Tu Xiao/Dong Dong  52.400 points  Takashi Sakamoto/Yasuhiro Ueyama  51.900  Viatchaslau Modzel/Mikalai Kazak  50.700
Trampoline Individual women:  He Wenna  56.275 points  Rosannagh MacLennan  55.360  Li Dan  55.330

Rugby union
Heineken Cup pool stage Matchday 2:
Pool 3:
Leinster  38–13  Glasgow Warriors
Bath  16–13  Montpellier
Standings (after 2 matches): Leinster 7 points, Bath 5, Glasgow Warriors 4, Montpellier 3.
Amlin Challenge Cup pool stage Matchday 2:
Pool 3: London Wasps  38–7  Rovigo
Standings (after 2 matches): London Wasps 10 points,  Bayonne 9,  Bordeaux Bègles, Rovigo 0.
Pool 5: Agen  8–29  Brive
Standings (after 2 matches): Brive 8 points,  Sale Sharks, Agen 5,  La Vila 0.

Speed skating
World Cup 1 in Chelyabinsk, Russia:
Men's 1000m:  Stefan Groothuis  1:08.49  Kjeld Nuis  1:08.56  Denny Morrison  1:09.26
Men's team pursuit:   (Sven Kramer, Jan Blokhuijsen, Wouter olde Heuvel) 3:41.25   (Shani Davis, Jonathan Kuck, Brian Hansen) 3:44.52   (Patrick Beckert, Marco Weber, Alexej Baumgartner) 3:45.29
Women's 1000m:  Christine Nesbitt  1:15.97  Margot Boer  1:16.52  Marrit Leenstra  1:16.77
Women's team pursuit:   (Brittany Schussler, Cindy Klassen, Nesbitt) 3:02.07   (Ireen Wüst, Diane Valkenburg, Leenstra) 3:02.72   (Yuliya Skokova, Yekaterina Lobysheva, Yekaterina Shikhova) 3:03.37

Volleyball
FIVB Men's World Cup in Japan, Matchday 1:
 0–3 
 3–0 
 3–1 
 0–3 
 1–3 
 0–3

November 19, 2011 (Saturday)

Auto racing
Nationwide Series:
Ford 300 in Homestead, Florida: (1)  Brad Keselowski (Dodge; Penske Racing) (2)  Ricky Stenhouse Jr. (Ford; Roush Fenway Racing) (3)  Carl Edwards (Ford; Roush Fenway Racing)
Final drivers' championship standings: (1) Stenhouse Jr. 1222 points (2)  Elliott Sadler (Chevrolet; Kevin Harvick Incorporated) 1177 (3)  Justin Allgaier (Chevrolet; Turner Motorsports) 1105
Stenhouse Jr. wins the title for the first time.
V8 Supercars:
Norton 360 Sandown Challenge in Melbourne, Victoria (AUS, Holden VE Commodore unless stated):
Race 25: (1) Rick Kelly (Kelly Racing) (2) James Courtney (Holden Racing Team) (3) Todd Kelly (Kelly Racing)
Drivers' championship standings (after 25 of 28 races): (1) Jamie Whincup (Triple Eight Race Engineering) 2883 points (2) Craig Lowndes (Triple Eight Race Engineering) 2725 (3) Shane van Gisbergen  (Stone Brothers Racing; Ford FG Falcon) 2312

Baseball
Japan Series, Game 6 in Fukuoka: Chunichi Dragons 2, Fukuoka SoftBank Hawks 1. Series tied 3–3.

Cricket
Australia in South Africa:
2nd Test in Johannesburg, day 3:  266 & 229/3 (69 overs);  296. South Africa lead by 199 runs with 7 wickets remaining.

Cross-country skiing
World Cup in Sjusjøen, Norway:
Men's 15 km Free Individual:  Johan Olsson  32:40.9  Petter Northug  33:12.1  Roland Clara  33:12.3
Women's 10 km Free Individual:  Marit Bjørgen  24:22.3  Charlotte Kalla  24:49.4  Vibeke Skofterud  24:51.3
Bjørgen wins her 47th World Cup race, and surpasses Bjørn Dæhlie  for the most wins in World Cup racing.

Curling
Pacific-Asia Championships in Nanjing, China:
Men:
Draw 1:
 5–9 
 4–11 
 6–3 
Women:
Draw 1:
 2–8 
 9–4

Figure skating
ISU Grand Prix:
Trophée Eric Bompard in Paris, France:
Men:  Patrick Chan  240.60 points  Song Nan  224.10  Michal Březina  218.60
Standings (after 5 of 6 events): Chan 30 points (2 events), Daisuke Takahashi  & Březina 26 (2), Song & Takahiko Kozuka  24 (2), Adam Rippon  18 (2).
Pairs:  Tatiana Volosozhar/Maxim Trankov  194.13 points  Vera Bazarova/Yuri Larionov  184.91  Meagan Duhamel/Eric Radford  176.62
Standings (after 5 of 6 events): Volosozhar/Trankov & Yuko Kavaguti/Alexander Smirnov  30 points (2 events), Aliona Savchenko/Robin Szolkowy  & Zhang Dan/Zhang Hao  26 (2), Narumi Takahashi/Mervin Tran , Duhamel/Radford & Kirsten Moore-Towers/Dylan Moscovitch  22 (2).
Ladies:  Elizaveta Tuktamysheva  182.89 points  Carolina Kostner  179.32  Alissa Czisny  179.15
Standings (after 5 of 6 events): Tuktamysheva 30 points (2 events), Kostner & Akiko Suzuki  28 (2), Czisny 26 (2), Mirai Nagasu , Ashley Wagner  & Alena Leonova  20 (2).
Ice Dance:  Tessa Virtue/Scott Moir  176.93 points  Nathalie Péchalat/Fabian Bourzat  164.56  Anna Cappellini/Luca Lanotte  153.76
Standings (after 5 of 6 events): Virtue/Moir 30 points (2 events), Maia Shibutani/Alex Shibutani  28 (2), Péchalat/Bourzat & Kaitlyn Weaver/Andrew Poje  26 (2), Cappellini/Lanotte 22 (2), Elena Ilinykh/Nikita Katsalapov  20 (2).

Football (soccer)
UEFA Women's Euro 2013 qualifying Matchday 5:
Group 1:
 2–6 
 0–4 
 0–5 
Standings (after 4 matches unless stated): Italy 12 points, Russia 9, Poland 6, Bosnia and Herzegovina 3, Greece, Macedonia 1 (3).
Group 2:  17–0 
Standings (after 3 matches unless stated): Germany,  9 points,  6 (4), Kazakhstan 4 (5),  3,  1 (4).
Group 3:
 5–0 
 3–1 
Standings (after 4 matches unless stated):  13 points (5 matches), Belgium 7, Northern Ireland 6 (3), Norway 6,  3, Bulgaria 0.
Group 5:  3–0 
Standings (after 3 matches unless stated): Slovakia 7 points,  4 (2), Belarus 4,  4 (2),  0 (4).
Group 6:
 4–2 
 0–2 
Standings (after 4 matches unless stated): Netherlands 10 points, Serbia 7,  5 (3), Slovenia 1, Croatia 1 (3).
Group 7:  0–1 
Standings (after 4 matches unless stated):  9 points (3 matches), Austria 7,  4 (2), Portugal 3,  0 (3).
CAF Confederation Cup Final first leg: Club Africain  1–0  Maghreb de Fès
OFC Champions League group stage Matchday 2:
Group B:
Auckland City  2–0  Hekari United
Amicale  2–0  Koloale
Standings (after 2 matches): Auckland City 6 points, Amicale 4, Hekari United 1, Koloale 0.

Gymnastics
Trampoline World Championships in Birmingham, England:
Double Mini Trampoline Team men:   (Denis Vachon, Alexander Seifert, Keegan Soehn, Jonathon Schwaiger) 108.600 points   (Edmon de Abreu, Arthur Iotte, Bruno Martini, Rodrigo Bachur) 103.200   (Ryan Roberts, Austin White, Kalon Ludvigson, Trey Katz) 85.600
Double Mini Trampoline Team women:   (Gillian Bruce, Mariah Madigan, Corissa Boychuk, Chelsea Nerpio) 104.100 points   (Joana Pereira da Silva, Andreia Robalo, Silvia Saiote, Ana Robalo) 102.900   (Kristle Lowell, Marina Moskalenko, Erin Jauch, Erica Owen) 100.800
Tumbling Team men:   (Zhang Lingfeng, Zhang Luo, Yang Song, Tao Yi) 115.500 points   (Grigory Noskov, Tagir Murtazaev, Andrey Krylov, Mikhail Kostyanov) 113.000   (Schwaiger, Jocelyn Charpentier-Leclerc, Seifert, Vincent Lavoie) 103.100
Tumbling Team women:   (Chen Lingxi, Jia Fangfang, Zhang Yuanyuan, Guan Shuang) 102.000 points   (Victoria Danilenko, Anzhelika Soldatkina, Anna Korobeynikova, Elena Krasnokutskaya) 101.000   (Mathilde Millory, Lauriane Lamperim, Jessica Courrèges-Clercq) 95.200
Synchronised women:  Anna Dogonadze/Jessica Simon  48.100 points  Karen Cockburn/Rosannagh MacLennan  47.600  Amanda Parker/Kat Driscoll  47.000
Trampoline Individual men:  Lu Chunlong  62.145 points  Dong Dong  61.460  Masaki Ito  60.864

Mixed martial arts
UFC 139 in San Jose, California, United States (USA unless stated):
Light Heavyweight bout: Dan Henderson def. Maurício Rua  via unanimous decision (48–47, 48–47, 48–47)
Middleweight bout: Wanderlei Silva  def. Cung Le via TKO (knees and punches)
Bantamweight bout: Urijah Faber def. Brian Bowles via submission (guillotine choke)
Welterweight bout: Martin Kampmann  def. Rick Story via unanimous decision (30–27, 30–27, 29–28)
Light Heavyweight bout: Stephan Bonnar def. Kyle Kingsbury via unanimous decision (30–27, 30–25, 30–27)

Rugby league
Four Nations Final in Leeds:  30–8 
Australia win the title for the second time.

Rugby union
Heineken Cup pool stage Matchday 2:
Pool 1: Castres  24–27  Munster
Standings (after 2 matches):  Scarlets 9 points, Munster 8,  Northampton Saints 2, Castres 1.
Pool 4: Leicester Tigers  20–9  Ulster
Standings (after 2 matches): Leicester Tigers 8 points,  Clermont 6, Ulster 4,  Aironi 0.
Pool 5:
Biarritz  15–10  Saracens
Benetton Treviso  26–26  Ospreys
Standings (after 2 matches): Saracens, Ospreys 6 points, Biarritz 5, Benetton Treviso 2.
Pool 6:
Gloucester  9–28  Harlequins
Connacht  10–36  Toulouse
Standings (after 2 matches): Toulouse, Harlequins 8 points, Gloucester 1, Connacht 0.
Amlin Challenge Cup pool stage Matchday 2:
Pool 1: Crociati Parma  3–34  Worcester Warriors
Standings (after 2 matches):  Stade Français 9 points, Worcester Warriors,  București Oaks 5, Crociati Parma 0.
Pool 2:
Petrarca Padova  3–34  Newcastle Falcons
Lyon  19–26  Toulon
Standings (after 2 matches): Toulon, Newcastle Falcons 9 points, Lyon 1, Petrarca Padova 0.
Pool 4: Exeter Chiefs  68–0  Cavalieri Prato
Standings (after 2 matches):  Newport Gwent Dragons 9 points, Exeter Chiefs 6,  Perpignan 4, Cavalieri Prato 0.

Speed skating
World Cup 1 in Chelyabinsk, Russia:
500 m women:  Yu Jing  37.65  Lee Sang-Hwa  38.09  Jenny Wolf  38.22
Standings (after 2 of 12 races): (1) Yu 200 points (2) Thijsje Oenema  140 (3) Lee 130
500 m men:  Joji Kato  34.92  Mo Tae-Bum  35.01  Yūya Oikawa  35.14
Standings (after 2 of 12 races): (1) Kato 145 points (2) Oikawa 140 (3) Jan Smeekens  130
1500 m women:  Ireen Wüst  1:57.02  Christine Nesbitt  1:57.44  Marrit Leenstra  1:58.27
5000 m men (all NED):  Jorrit Bergsma 6:18.74  Sven Kramer 6:20.60  Bob de Jong 6:21.96

Snowboarding
World Cup in Stockholm, Sweden:
Big Air men:  Niklas Mattsson  172.4 points  Michael Macho  167.4  Alexey Sobolev  163.4
Big Air standings: (1) Mattsson 1160 points (2) Janne Korpi  1020 (3) Seppe Smits  850
Freestyle Overall standings: (1) Korpi 2620 points (2) Dimi de Jong  1480 (3) Mattsson 1160

November 18, 2011 (Friday)

Chess
Women's World Championship in Tirana, Albania:
Game 4: Hou Yifan  ½–½ Koneru Humpy . Hou leads series 2½–1½.

Cricket
Australia in South Africa:
2nd Test in Johannesburg, day 2:  266 & 0/0 (0.4 overs);  296 (76.4 overs). South Africa trail by 30 runs with 10 wickets remaining.
Pakistan vs Sri Lanka in UAE:
3rd ODI in Dubai:  257/8 (50 overs);  236 (48.5 overs). Pakistan win by 21 runs; lead 5-match series 2–1.

Gymnastics
Trampoline World Championships in Birmingham, England:
Trampoline team men:   (Tetsuya Sotomura, Yasuhiro Uyeyama, Masaki Ito) 175.474 points   (Tu Xiao, Lu Chunlong, Dong Dong) 154.440   (Aleksey Ilichev, Nikita Fedorenko, Dmitry Ushakov) 152.030
Trampoline team women:   (He Wenna, Le Dan, Huang Shanshan) 164.485 points   (Kat Driscoll, Laura Gallagher, Emma Smith) 159.585   (Karen Cockburn, Rosannagh MacLennan, Samantha Smith) 159.085

Rugby union
Heineken Cup pool stage Matchday 2:
Pool 1: Northampton Saints  23–28  Scarlets
Standings: Scarlets 9 points (2 matches),  Munster 4 (1), Northampton Saints 2 (2),  Castres 0 (1).
Pool 2:
Cardiff Blues  24–18  London Irish
Edinburgh  48–47  Racing Métro
Standings (after 2 matches): Edinburgh 9 points, Cardiff Blues 8, Racing Métro 3, London Irish 2.
Pool 4: Clermont  54–3  Aironi
Standings: Clermont 6 points (2 matches),  Leicester Tigers,  Ulster 4 (1), Aironi 0 (2).
Amlin Challenge Cup pool stage Matchday 2:
Pool 1: Stade Français  49–3  București Oaks
Standings: Stade Français 9 points (2 matches), București Oaks 5 (2),  Worcester Warriors,  Crociati Parma 0 (1).
Pool 5: Sale Sharks  59–6  La Vila
Standings: Sale Sharks 5 points (2 matches),  Agen 5 (1),  Brive 4 (1), La Vila 0 (2).

Speed skating
World Cup 1 in Chelyabinsk, Russia:
Men's 500m:  Pekka Koskela  35.00  Jan Smeekens  35.01  Yūya Oikawa  35.07
Men's 1500m:  Stefan Groothuis  1:45.70  Shani Davis  1:46.27  Ivan Skobrev  1:46.47
Women's 500m:  Yu Jing  37.81  Maki Tsuji  & Thijsje Oenema  38.22(3)
Women's 3000m:  Martina Sáblíková  4:06.54  Ireen Wüst  4:07.16  Claudia Pechstein  4:07.81

Volleyball
FIVB Women's World Cup in Japan, Matchday 11 (teams in bold qualify for the 2012 Olympics):
 3–0 
 3–0 
 3–0 
 0–3 
 0–3 
 0–3 
Final standings: Italy 28 points, United States, China 26, Japan 24, Brazil 21, Germany 20, Serbia 18, Dominican Republic 12, South Korea 11, Argentina 9, Algeria 3, Kenya 0.
Italy win the Cup for the second successive time.

November 17, 2011 (Thursday)

Baseball
Japan Series, Game 5 in Nagoya: Fukuoka SoftBank Hawks 5, Chunichi Dragons 0. Hawks lead series 3–2.
Major League Baseball awards:
National League Cy Young Award: Clayton Kershaw, Los Angeles Dodgers

Basketball
Euroleague Regular Season Matchday 5:
Group B: Brose Baskets  79–76  Panathinaikos
Standings:  CSKA Moscow 5–0, Panathinaikos,  Unicaja 3–2, Brose Baskets 2–3,  Žalgiris,  KK Zagreb 1–4.
Group C:
Maccabi Tel Aviv  69–59  Spirou Charleroi
Real Madrid  104–84  Anadolu Efes
EA7 Emporio Armani  65–69  Partizan Mt:s Belgrade
Standings: Maccabi Tel Aviv 4–1, Real Madrid, Partizan Mt:s Belgrade 3–2, EA7 Emporio Armani, Anadolu Efes 2–3, Spirou Charleroi 1–4.
Group D:
UNICS Kazan  81–51  Union Olimpija Ljubljana
Galatasaray Medical Park  66–70  FC Barcelona Regal
Montepaschi Siena  84–73  Asseco Prokom Gdynia
Standings: FC Barcelona Regal 5–0, Montepaschi Siena 4–1, UNICS Kazan 3–2, Galatasaray Medical Park 2–3, Union Olimpija Ljubljana 1–4, Asseco Prokom Gdynia 0–5.

Chess
Women's World Championship in Tirana, Albania:
Game 3: Koneru Humpy  0–1 Hou Yifan . Hou leads series 2–1.

Cricket
West Indies in India:
2nd Test in Kolkata, day 4:  631/7d;  153 & 463 (f/o, 126.3 overs; Darren Bravo 136). India win by an innings and 15 runs; lead 3-match series 2–0.
Australia in South Africa:
2nd Test in Johannesburg, day 1:  266 (71 overs); .

Football (soccer)
Copa Sudamericana Quarterfinals second leg (first leg scores in parentheses):
Universidad de Chile  3–0 (2–1)  Arsenal. Universidad de Chile win 6–0 on points.
Libertad  1–0 (0–1)  LDU Quito. 3–3 on points, 1–1 on aggregate; LDU Quito win 5–4 on penalties.

Rugby union
Amlin Challenge Cup pool stage Matchday 2:
Pool 3: Bayonne  20–3  Bordeaux Bègles
Standings: Bayonne 9 points (2 matches),  London Wasps 5 (1), Bordeaux Bègles 0 (2),  Rovigo 0 (1).
Pool 4: Newport Gwent Dragons  23–13  Perpignan
Standings: Newport Gwent Dragons 9 points (2 matches), Perpignan 4 (2),  Exeter Chiefs 1 (1),  Cavalieri Prato 0 (1).

Volleyball
FIVB Women's World Cup in Japan, Matchday 10 (teams in bold qualify for the 2012 Olympics):
 3–0 
 1–3 
 3–2 
 3–2 
 0–3 
 0–3 
Standings (after 10 matches): United States 26 points, Italy 25, China 23, Japan 21, Germany 20, Brazil 18, Serbia 15, Dominican Republic 12, Argentina 9, South Korea 8, Algeria 3, Kenya 0.

November 16, 2011 (Wednesday)

Baseball
Japan Series, Game 4 in Nagoya: Fukuoka SoftBank Hawks 2, Chunichi Dragons 1. Series tied 2–2.
Major League Baseball awards:
Managers of the Year:
American League: Joe Maddon, Tampa Bay Rays
National League: Kirk Gibson, Arizona Diamondbacks

Basketball
Euroleague Regular Season Matchday 5:
Group A:
Fenerbahçe Ülker  85–83 (OT)  Bennet Cantù
Caja Laboral  84–89  Gescrap Bizkaia
Olympiacos  91–78  SLUC Nancy
Standings: Caja Laboral, Bennet Cantù, Fenerbahçe Ülker 3–2, Olympiacos, Gescrap Bizkaia, SLUC Nancy 2–3.
Group B:
CSKA Moscow  77–66  Unicaja
KK Zagreb  80–78  Žalgiris
Standings: CSKA Moscow 5–0,  Panathinaikos 3–1, Unicaja 3–2,  Brose Baskets 1–3, Žalgiris, KK Zagreb 1–4.

Cricket
West Indies in India:
2nd Test in Kolkata, day 3:  631/7d;  153 (48 overs) & 195/3 (f/o, 62 overs). West Indies trail by 283 runs with 7 wickets remaining.

Football (soccer)
2014 FIFA World Cup qualification (CAF) First Round, second leg (first leg score in parentheses):  5–0 (0–0) . Ethiopia win 5–0 on aggregate.

Volleyball
FIVB Women's World Cup in Japan, Matchday 9 (team in bold qualify for the 2012 Olympics):
 2–3 
 3–2 
 3–0 
 3–2 
 0–3 
 0–3 
Standings (after 9 matches): Italy 25 points, United States 23, China 20, Japan, Germany 19, Brazil 15, Serbia 12, Dominican Republic 10, Argentina 9, South Korea 7, Algeria 3, Kenya 0.

November 15, 2011 (Tuesday)

Baseball
Japan Series, Game 3 in Nagoya: Fukuoka SoftBank Hawks 4, Chunichi Dragons 2. Dragons lead series 2–1.
Major League Baseball awards:
American League Cy Young Award: Justin Verlander, Detroit Tigers

Chess
Women's World Championship in Tirana, Albania:
Game 2: Hou Yifan  ½–½ Koneru Humpy . Series tied 1–1.

Cricket
West Indies in India:
2nd Test in Kolkata, day 2:  631/7d (151.2 overs; V. V. S. Laxman 176*, Mahendra Singh Dhoni 144);  34/2 (12 overs). West Indies trail by 597 runs with 8 wickets remaining in the 1st innings.

Football (soccer)
UEFA Euro 2012 Qualifying play-offs, second leg (first leg scores in parentheses):
 0–0 (3–0) . Croatia win 3–0 on aggregate.
 0–1 (0–2) . Czech Republic win 3–0 on aggregate.
 1–1 (4–0) . Republic of Ireland win 5–1 on aggregate.
 6–2 (0–0) . Portugal win 6–2 on aggregate.
2014 FIFA World Cup qualification (CONMEBOL) Matchday 4:
 1–2 
 2–0 
 2–0 
 1–0 
Standings (after 4 matches unless stated):  7 points (3 matches), Argentina, Venezuela 7, Ecuador 6 (3), Chile 6, Colombia 4 (3), Paraguay 4, Peru 3 (3), Bolivia 1.
2014 FIFA World Cup qualification (CAF) First Round, second leg (first leg scores in parentheses):
 2–1 (0–1) . 2–2 on aggregate; Lesotho win on away goals.
 2–1 (0–2) . Equatorial Guinea win 3–2 on aggregate.
 1–0 (1–1) . Togo win 2–1 on aggregate.
 3–1 (1–1) . Rwanda win 4–2 on aggregate.
 1–1 (5–0) . Congo win 6–1 on aggregate.
 0–1 (2–1) . 2–2 on aggregate; Tanzania win on away goals.
 4–0 (3–0) . Kenya win 7–0 on aggregate.
 4–1 (1–0) . Mozambique win 5–1 on aggregate.
 4–0 (4–0) . Namibia win 8–0 on aggregate.
 5–1 (3–1) . Congo DR win 8–2 on aggregate.
2014 FIFA World Cup qualification (AFC) Third Round, matchday 5 (teams in bold advance to the Fourth Round):
Group A:
 0–4 
 1–3 
Standings (after 5 matches): Jordan, Iraq 12 points, China PR 6, Singapore 0.
Group B:
 2–1 
 2–1 
Standings (after 5 matches): South Korea, Lebanon 10 points, Kuwait 8, United Arab Emirates 0.
Group C:
 1–0 
 3–0 
Standings (after 5 matches): Uzbekistan 13 points, Japan 10, North Korea 6, Tajikistan 0.
Group D:
 0–1 
 0–0 
Standings (after 5 matches): Australia 12 points, Saudi Arabia 6, Oman 5, Thailand 4.
Group E:
 1–4 
 0–0 
Standings (after 5 matches): Iran 11 points, Qatar 9, Bahrain 6, Indonesia 0.
2014 FIFA World Cup qualification (CONCACAF) Second Round, matchday 6 (teams in bold advance to the Third Round):
Group A:  4–0 
Final standings: El Salvador 18 points,  8, Suriname 7,  1.
Group B:  2–0 
Final standings: Guyana 13 points, Trinidad and Tobago 12,  10,  0.
Group C:  3–0 
Final standings: Panama 12 points,  6, Dominica 0.
Group D:  4–0 
Final standings: Canada 14 points,  9, Saint Kitts and Nevis 7,  1.
Group E:
 1–4 
 0–2 
Final standings: Guatemala 18 points, Belize 7, Saint Vincent and the Grenadines 5, Grenada 4.
Group F:
 2–1 
 6–1 
Final standings: Antigua and Barbuda 15 points, Haiti 13, Curaçao 7, U.S. Virgin Islands 0.
Friendly internationals (top 10 in FIFA World Rankings):
 2–2 (1) 
(3)  3–0 (2) 
(6)  0–1 (4) 
(7)  1–0 
(10)  2–1

November 14, 2011 (Monday)

Baseball
Major League Baseball awards:
Rookies of the Year:
American League: Jeremy Hellickson, Tampa Bay Rays
National League: Craig Kimbrel, Atlanta Braves
Nippon Professional Baseball awards:
Eiji Sawamura Award: Masahiro Tanaka, Tohoku Rakuten Golden Eagles

Chess
Women's World Championship in Tirana, Albania:
Game 1: Koneru Humpy  ½–½ Hou Yifan

Cricket
West Indies in India:
2nd Test in Kolkata, day 1:  346/5 (87.3 overs; Rahul Dravid 119); .
Pakistan vs Sri Lanka in UAE:
2nd ODI in Dubai:  235/7 (50 overs);  210 (46.3 overs). Sri Lanka win by 25 runs; 5-match series tied 1–1.

Football (soccer)
2014 FIFA World Cup qualification (CONCACAF) Second Round, matchday 6 (teams in bold advance to the Third Round):
Group A:  1–1 
Standings:  15 points (5 matches), Dominican Republic 8 (6),  7 (5), Cayman Islands 1 (6).
Group B:  1–2 
Standings:  13 points (5 matches), Bermuda 10 (6),  9 (5), Barbados 0 (6).
Group D:  3–0 
Standings:  11 points (5 matches), Puerto Rico 9 (6),  7 (5), Saint Lucia 1 (6).
Friendly international in Al Rayyan, Qatar (top 10 in FIFA World Rankings):  0–2 (5)

Golf
European Tour:
Barclays Singapore Open in Sentosa, Singapore:
Winner: Gonzalo Fernández-Castaño  199 (−14)PO
Fernández-Castaño defeats Juvic Pagunsan  on the second playoff hole, to win his fifth European Tour title and first since 2008.

November 13, 2011 (Sunday)

Auto racing
Formula One:
 in Yas Island, United Arab Emirates: (1) Lewis Hamilton  (McLaren-Mercedes) (2) Fernando Alonso  (Ferrari) (3) Jenson Button  (McLaren-Mercedes)
Drivers' championship standings (after 18 of 19 races): (1) Sebastian Vettel  (Red Bull-Renault) 374 points (2) Button 255 (3) Alonso 245
Sprint Cup Series – Chase for the Sprint Cup:
Kobalt Tools 500 in Avondale, Arizona: (1)  Kasey Kahne (Toyota; Red Bull Racing Team) (2)  Carl Edwards (Ford; Roush Fenway Racing) (3)  Tony Stewart (Chevrolet; Stewart Haas Racing)
Drivers' championship standings (after 35 of 36 races): (1) Edwards 2359 points (2) Stewart 2356 (3)  Kevin Harvick (Chevrolet; Richard Childress Racing) 2308
V8 Supercars:
Falken Tasmania Challenge in Launceston, Tasmania (all AUS):
Race 24: (1) Jamie Whincup (Triple Eight Race Engineering; Holden VE Commodore) (2) Will Davison (Ford Performance Racing; Ford FG Falcon) (3) Mark Winterbottom (Ford Performance Racing; Ford FG Falcon)
Drivers' championship standings (after 24 of 28 races): (1) Whincup 2817 points (2) Craig Lowndes (Triple Eight Race Engineering; Holden VE Commodore) 2623 (3) Winterbottom 2215
World Rally Championship:
Wales Rally GB in Cardiff, Great Britain (all Ford Fiesta RS WRC): (1) Jari-Matti Latvala/Miikka Anttila  (2) Mads Østberg /Jonas Andersson  (3) Henning Solberg /Ilka Minor 
Final drivers' championship standings: (1) Sébastien Loeb  (Citroën DS3 WRC) 222 points (2) Mikko Hirvonen  (Ford Fiesta RS WRC) 214 (3) Sébastien Ogier  (Citroën DS3 WRC) 196
Loeb wins his eighth consecutive world title.

Baseball
Japan Series, Game 2 in Fukuoka: Chunichi Dragons 2, Fukuoka SoftBank Hawks 1 (F/10). Dragons lead series 2–0.

Figure skating
ISU Grand Prix:
NHK Trophy in Sapporo, Japan:
Men:  Daisuke Takahashi  259.75 points  Takahiko Kozuka  235.02  Ross Miner  212.36
Standings (after 4 of 6 events): Takahashi 26 points (2 events), Kozuka 24 (2), Kevin van der Perren  & Miner 16 (2), Patrick Chan , Jeremy Abbott  & Michal Březina  15 (1).

Football (soccer)
 Kazakhstan Cup Final in Almaty: Tobol 0–1 Ordabasy
Ordabasy win the Cup for the first time.

Golf
European Tour:
Barclays Singapore Open in Sentosa, Singapore: Playoff suspended due to lightning; play continues November 14.
LPGA Tour:
Lorena Ochoa Invitational in Guadalajara, Mexico:
Winner: Catriona Matthew  276 (−12)
Matthew wins her fourth LPGA Tour title.

Rugby league
Four Nations in England and Wales (teams in bold advance to the Final):
Round three in Wrexham:  14–56 
Final standings: Australia 6 points,  4,  2, Wales 0.

Rugby union
Heineken Cup pool stage Matchday 1:
Pool 3: Glasgow Warriors  26–21  Bath
Pool 5: Saracens  42–17  Benetton Treviso
Pool 6: Toulouse  21–17  Gloucester
Amlin Challenge Cup pool stage Matchday 1:
Pool 1: Bucharest Wolves  34–7  Crociati Parma

Snooker
Players Tour Championship – Event 9: Antwerp Open in Antwerp, Belgium:
Final: Ronnie O'Sullivan  3–4 Judd Trump 
Trump wins his sixth professional title.
Order of Merit (after 9 of 12 events): (1) O'Sullivan 29,600 (2) Trump 28,900 (3) Neil Robertson  27,100

Tennis
ATP World Tour:
BNP Paribas Masters in Paris, France:
Final: Roger Federer  def. Jo-Wilfried Tsonga  6–1, 7–6(3)
Federer wins his third title of the year, and 69th of his career.

Volleyball
FIVB Women's World Cup in Japan, Matchday 8:
 3–0 
 3–0 
 3–0 
 0–3 
 3–1 
 0–3 
Standings (after 8 matches): Italy 23 points, United States 21, China 19, Germany 18, Japan 16, Brazil 12, Serbia 11, Argentina 9, Dominican Republic 8, South Korea 4, Algeria 3, Kenya 0.

Weightlifting
World Championships in Paris, France:
Men's +105 kg:
Snatch:  Behdad Salimi  214 kg (WR)  Ihor Shymechko  200 kg  Sajjad Anoushiravani  198 kg
Clean & Jerk:  Salimi 250 kg  Anoushiravani 241 kg  Jeon Sang-Guen  241 kg
Total:  Salimi 464 kg  Anoushiravani 439 kg  Jeon 433 kg
Women's +75 kg:
Snatch:  Tatiana Kashirina  147 kg (WR)  Zhou Lulu  146 kg  Olha Korobka  127 kg
Clean & Jerk:  Zhou 182 kg  Kashirina 175 kg  Korobka 157 kg
Total:  Zhou 328 kg (WR)  Kashirina 322 kg  Korobka 284 kg

November 12, 2011 (Saturday)

Auto racing
Nationwide Series:
WYPALL* 200 Powered by Kimberly-Clark Professional in Avondale, Arizona: (1)  Sam Hornish Jr. (Dodge; Penske Racing) (2)  Brad Keselowski (Dodge; Penske Racing) (3)  Carl Edwards (Ford; Roush Fenway Racing)
Drivers' championship standings (after 33 of 34 races): (1)  Ricky Stenhouse Jr. (Ford; Roush Fenway Racing) 1179 points (2)  Elliott Sadler (Chevrolet; Kevin Harvick Incorporated) 1138 (3)  Justin Allgaier (Chevrolet; Turner Motorsports) 1074
V8 Supercars:
Falken Tasmania Challenge in Launceston, Tasmania (AUS unless stated):
Race 23 (all Holden VE Commodore): (1) Jamie Whincup (Triple Eight Race Engineering) (2) Craig Lowndes (Triple Eight Race Engineering) (3) Garth Tander (Holden Racing Team)
Drivers' championship standings (after 23 of 28 races): (1) Whincup 2667 points (2) Lowndes 2512 (3) Shane van Gisbergen (Stone Brothers Racing; Ford FG Falcon) 2105

Baseball
Japan Series, Game 1 in Fukuoka: Chunichi Dragons 2, Fukuoka SoftBank Hawks 1 (F/10). Dragons lead series 1–0.

Figure skating
ISU Grand Prix:
NHK Trophy in Sapporo, Japan:
Ice dancing:  Maia Shibutani/Alex Shibutani  151.85 points  Kaitlyn Weaver/Andrew Poje  151.76  Elena Ilinykh/Nikita Katsalapov  149.48
Standings (after 4 of 6 events): Shibutani/Shibutani 28 points (2 events), Weaver/Poje 26 (2), Nelli Zhiganshina/Alexander Gazsi  18 (2), Tessa Virtue/Scott Moir , Meryl Davis/Charlie White  & Ekaterina Bobrova/Dmitri Soloviev  15 (1).
Pairs:  Yuko Kavaguti/Alexander Smirnov  177.51 points  Narumi Takahashi/Mervin Tran  172.09  Aliona Savchenko/Robin Szolkowy  171.68
Standings (after 4 of 6 events): Kavaguti/Smirnov 30 points (2 events), Savchenko/Szolkowy & Zhang Dan/Zhang Hao  26 (2), Takahashi/Tran & Kirsten Moore-Towers/Dylan Moscovitch  22 (2), Sui Wenjing/Han Cong  20 (2).
Ladies:  Akiko Suzuki  185.98 points  Mao Asada  184.19  Alena Leonova  170.68
Standings (after 4 of 6 events): Carolina Kostner  & Suzuki 28 points (2 events), Mirai Nagasu , Ashley Wagner  & Leonova 20 (2), Alissa Czisny  & Elizaveta Tuktamysheva  15 (1).

Football (soccer)
2014 FIFA World Cup qualification (CAF) First Round, first leg:  0–0  in Djibouti
Friendly international (top 10 in FIFA World Rankings): (7)  1–0 (1) 
CAF Champions League Final second leg (first leg score in parentheses): Espérance ST  1–0 (0–0)  Wydad Casablanca
Espérance ST win the title for the second time, and qualify for the Club World Cup.

Mixed martial arts
UFC on Fox: Velasquez vs. Dos Santos in Anaheim, California, United States:
Heavyweight Championship bout: Junior dos Santos  def. Cain Velasquez  (c) via KO (punches)

Rugby league
Four Nations in England and Wales (teams in bold advance to the Final):
Round three in Hull:  28–6 
Standings: England 4 points (3 matches),  4 (2), New Zealand 2 (3),  0 (2).

Rugby union
Heineken Cup pool stage Matchday 1:
Pool 1:
Scarlets  31–23  Castres
Munster  23–21  Northampton Saints
Pool 2: London Irish  19–20  Edinburgh
Pool 3: Montpellier  16–16  Leinster
Pool 4:
Aironi  12–28  Leicester Tigers
Ulster  16–11  Clermont
Pool 5: Ospreys  28–21  Biarritz
Amlin Challenge Cup pool stage Matchday 1:
Pool 2: Newcastle Falcons  27–19  Lyon
Pool 3:
Rugby Rovigo  10–43  Bayonne
Bordeaux-Bègles  14–47  London Wasps
Pool 4: Cavalieri Prato  3–33  Newport Gwent Dragons
Pool 5:
La Vila  10–50  Agen
Brive  26–18  Sale Sharks

Volleyball
FIVB Women's World Cup in Japan, Matchday 7:
 3–0 
 3–1 
 3–0 
 3–2 
 3–0 
 0–3 
Standings (after 7 matches): Italy 20 points, United States 18, China 16, Germany 15, Japan 13, Brazil 12, Serbia 11, Argentina 9, Dominican Republic 8, South Korea 4, Kenya, Algeria 0.

Weightlifting
World Championships in Paris, France:
Men's 94 kg:
Snatch:  Aleksandr Ivanov  186 kg  Artem Ivanov  186 kg  Kim Min-Jae  182 kg
Clean & Jerk:  Ilya Ilin  226 kg  Ruslan Nurudinov  221 kg  Saeid Mohammadpour  221 kg
Total:  Ilin 407 kg  Artem Ivanov 407 kg  Mohammadpour 402 kg
Men's 105 kg:
Snatch:  Khadzhimurat Akkayev  198 kg  Dmitry Klokov  196 kg  Gia Machavariani  187 kg
Clean & Jerk:  Akkayev 232 kg  Klokov 232 kg  Oleksiy Torokhtiy  229 kg
Total:  Akkayev 430 kg  Klokov 428 kg  Torokhtiy 410 kg

November 11, 2011 (Friday)

Cricket
Australia in South Africa:
1st Test in Cape Town, day 3:  284 & 47;  96 & 236/2 (50.2 overs; Hashim Amla 112, Graeme Smith 101*). South Africa win by 8 wickets; lead 2-match series 1–0.
Pakistan vs Sri Lanka in UAE:
1st ODI in Dubai:  131 (40.3 overs);  132/2 (21.5 overs). Pakistan win by 8 wickets; lead 5-match series 1–0.

Football (soccer)
UEFA Euro 2012 Qualifying play-offs, first leg:
 0–0 
 0–3 
 2–0 
 0–4 
2014 FIFA World Cup qualification (CONMEBOL) Matchday 3:
 1–1 
 4–0 
 1–1 
 2–1 
Standings (after 3 matches unless stated): Uruguay 7 points, Argentina 4, Colombia 4 (2), Paraguay, Venezuela 4, Ecuador,  3 (2), Chile 3, Bolivia 1.
2014 FIFA World Cup qualification (CAF) First Round, first leg:
 0–4 
 0–1 
 0–5 
 1–1 
 1–2 
 2–0 
 0–3 
 1–1 
 – . Liberia advance to the Second Round due to Mauritius' withdrawal.
 1–3 
 1–0 
2014 FIFA World Cup qualification (AFC) Third Round, matchday 4 (teams in bold advance to the Fourth Round):
Group A:
 1–0 
 2–0 
Standings (after 4 matches): Jordan 12 points, Iraq 9, China PR 3, Singapore 0.
Group B:
 0–2 
 0–1 
Standings (after 4 matches): South Korea 10 points, Lebanon 7, Kuwait 5, United Arab Emirates 0.
Group C:
 0–4 
 1–0 
Standings (after 4 matches): Japan, Uzbekistan 10 points, North Korea 3, Tajikistan 0.
Group D:
 1–0 
 3–0 
Standings (after 4 matches): Australia 9 points, Saudi Arabia 5, Thailand, Oman 4.
Group E:
 1–1 
 4–0 
Standings (after 4 matches): Iran, Qatar 8 points, Bahrain 5, Indonesia 0.
2014 FIFA World Cup qualification (CONCACAF) Second Round, matchday 5 (teams in bold advance to the Third Round):
Group A:
 4–0 
 1–3 
Standings (after 5 matches): El Salvador 15 points, Dominican Republic, Suriname 7, Cayman Islands 0.
Group B:
 2–1 
 2–1 
Standings (after 5 matches): Guyana 13 points, Trinidad and Tobago 9, Bermuda 7, Barbados 0.
Group C:  1–0 
Standings:  9 points (3 matches), Nicaragua 6 (4), Dominica 0 (3).
Group D:
 0–0 
 0–4 
Standings (after 5 matches): Canada 11 points, Saint Kitts and Nevis 7, Puerto Rico 6, Saint Lucia 1.
Group E:
 1–1 
 3–0 
Standings (after 5 matches): Guatemala 15 points, Saint Vincent and the Grenadines 5, Belize, Grenada 4.
Group F:
 0–3 
 1–0 
Standings (after 5 matches): Antigua and Barbuda 15 points, Haiti 10, Curaçao 4, U.S. Virgin Islands 0.
Friendly internationals (top 10 in FIFA World Rankings):
(2)  0–0 
 3–3 (3) 
 0–2 (6) 
(8)  1–1 
(10)  2–0

Rugby union
Heineken Cup pool stage Matchday 1:
Pool 2: Racing Métro  20–26  Cardiff Blues
Pool 6: Harlequins  25–17  Connacht
Amlin Challenge Cup pool stage Matchday 1:
Pool 4: Perpignan  15–12  Exeter Chiefs

Volleyball
FIVB Women's World Cup in Japan, Matchday 6:
 3–0 
 2–3 
 0–3 
 3–1 
 0–3 
 0–3 
Standings (after 6 matches): Italy 17 points, United States 15, Germany 14, China 13, Brazil 12, Serbia 11, Japan 10, Dominican Republic, Argentina 6, South Korea 4, Kenya, Algeria 0.

Weightlifting
World Championships in Paris, France:
Men's 85 kg:
Snatch:  Andrei Rybakou  178 kg  Adrian Zieliński  174 kg  Kianoush Rostami  173 kg
Clean & Jerk:  Rostami 209 kg  Benjamin Hennequin  208 kg  Yoelmis Hernández  205 kg
Total:  Rostami 382 kg  Hennequin 378 kg  Zieliński 376 kg

November 10, 2011 (Thursday)

Basketball
Euroleague Regular Season Matchday 4:
Group A: SLUC Nancy  90–85  Caja Laboral
Standings: Caja Laboral,  Bennet Cantù 3–1, SLUC Nancy,  Fenerbahçe Ülker 2–2,  Bizkaia Bilbao Basket,  Olympiacos 1–3.
Group B:
Žalgiris Kaunas  81–70  Brose Baskets
Panathinaikos  76–78 (OT)  CSKA Moscow
Standings: CSKA Moscow 4–0, Panathinaikos,  Unicaja 3–1, Brose Baskets, Žalgiris Kaunas 1–3,  KK Zagreb 0–4.
Group C:
Anadolu Efes  72–79  Maccabi Tel Aviv
Spirou Charleroi  76–81  EA7 Emporio Armani
Partizan Mt:s Belgrade  80–79  Real Madrid
Standings: Maccabi Tel Aviv 3–1, Real Madrid, Anadolu Efes, EA7 Emporio Armani, Partizan Mt:s Belgrade 2–2, Spirou Charleroi 1–3.
Group D: FC Barcelona Regal  92–75  Montepaschi Siena
Standings: FC Barcelona Regal 4–0, Montepaschi Siena 3–1,  Galatasaray Medical Park,  UNICS Kazan 2–2,  Union Olimpija Ljubljana 1–3,  Asseco Prokom Gdynia 0–4.

Cricket
Australia in South Africa:
1st Test in Cape Town, day 2:  284 (75 overs; Michael Clarke 151) & 47 (18 overs; Vernon Philander 5/15);  96 (24.3 overs; Shane Watson 5/17) & 81/1 (17 overs). South Africa require another 155 runs with 9 wickets remaining.
Australia record their lowest complete innings total since 1902.
23 wickets fall during the day, the most in a day since 1902.

Football (soccer)
Friendly international (top 10 in FIFA World Rankings):  0–2 (5) 
UEFA Women's Champions League Round of 16 second leg (first leg scores in parentheses):
LdB Malmö  1–0 (3–1)  SV Neulengbach. LdB Malmö win 4–1 on aggregate.
Göteborg FC  3–2 (1–0)  Fortuna Hjørring. Göteborg FC win 4–2 on aggregate.
Glasgow City  0–7 (0–10)  Turbine Potsdam. Turbine Potsdam win 17–0 on aggregate.
Copa Sudamericana Quarterfinals second leg (first leg score in parentheses): Vélez Sársfield  3–2 (1–1)  Santa Fe. Vélez Sársfield win 4–1 on points.

Rugby union
Amlin Challenge Cup pool stage Matchday 1:
Pool 1: Worcester Warriors  14–23  Stade Français
Pool 2: Toulon  53–22  Petrarca Padova

Weightlifting
World Championships in Paris, France:
Men's 77 kg:
Snatch:  Lü Xiaojun  170 kg  Su Dajin  166 kg  Tigran Gevorg Martirosyan  166 kg
Clean & Jerk:  Su 206 kg  Lu 205 kg  Sa Jae-Hyouk  203 kg
Total:  Lu 375 kg  Su 372 kg  Sa 360 kg
Lu wins the title for the second time.
Women's 75 kg:
Snatch:  Svetlana Podobedova  131 kg  Nadezhda Yevstyukhina  130 kg  Iryna Kulesha  121 kg
Clean & Jerk:  Yevstyukhina 163 kg (WR)  Podobedova 156 kg  Kim Un-Ju  151 kg
Total:  Yevstyukhina 293 kg  Podobedova 287 kg  Kim 265 kg

November 9, 2011 (Wednesday)

Basketball
Euroleague Regular Season Matchday 4:
Group A:
Bennet Cantù  64–63  Olympiacos
Bizkaia Bilbao Basket  70–73  Fenerbahçe Ülker
Standings:  Caja Laboral 3–0, Bennet Cantù 3–1, Fenerbahçe Ülker 2–2,  SLUC Nancy 1–2, Bizkaia Bilbao Basket, Olympiacos 1–3.
Group B: Unicaja  99–85  KK Zagreb
Standings:  CSKA Moscow,  Panathinaikos 3–0, Unicaja 3–1,  Brose Baskets 1–2,  Žalgiris Kaunas 0–3, KK Zagreb 0–4.
Group D:
Union Olimpija Ljubljana  70–79  Galatasaray Medical Park
Asseco Prokom Gdynia  68–72  UNICS Kazan
Standings:  FC Barcelona Regal,  Montepaschi Siena 3–0, Galatasaray Medical Park, UNICS Kazan 2–2, Union Olimpija Ljubljana 1–3, Asseco Prokom Gdynia 0–4.

College football
The Penn State Board of Trustees fires head coach Joe Paterno after 46 years in charge, over his alleged knowledge of the Penn State child sex abuse scandal.

Cricket
West Indies in India:
1st Test in Delhi, day 4:  304 & 180;  209 & 276/5 (80.4 overs). India win by 5 wickets; lead 3-match series 1–0.
Australia in South Africa:
1st Test in Cape Town, day 1:  214/8 (55 overs; Michael Clarke 107*); .

Football (soccer)
UEFA Women's Champions League Round of 16 second leg (first leg scores in parentheses):
Arsenal  5–1 (1–1)  Rayo Vallecano. Arsenal win 6–2 on aggregate.
WFC Rossiyanka  3–3 (4–0)  FC Energy Voronezh. Rossiyanka win 7–3 on aggregate.
Olympique Lyon  6–0 (6–0)  Sparta Praha. Lyon win 12–0 on aggregate.
Torres  1–3 (1–2)  Brøndby IF. Brøndby IF win 5–2 on aggregate.
Paris Saint-Germain  2–1 (0–3)  1. FFC Frankfurt. 1. FFC Frankfurt win 4–2 on aggregate.
Copa Sudamericana Quarterfinals second leg (first leg score in parentheses): Vasco da Gama  5–2 (0–2)  Universitario. 3–3 on points; Vasco da Gama win 5–4 on aggregate.

Volleyball
FIVB Women's World Cup in Japan, Matchday 5:
 0–3 
 0–3 
 0–3 
 0–3 
 3–2 
 3–0 
Standings (after 5 matches): Italy 14 points, United States, China 12, Germany 11, Brazil, Japan 10, Serbia 8, Argentina 6, South Korea 4, Dominican Republic 3, Kenya, Algeria 0.

Weightlifting
World Championships in Paris, France:
Women's 69 kg:
Snatch:  Oksana Slivenko  118 kg  Xiang Yanmei  116 kg  Huang Shih-hsu  116 kg
Clean & Jerk:  Slivenko 148 kg  Xiang 148 kg  Tatiana Matveyeva  143 kg
Total:  Slivenko 266 kg  Xiang 264 kg  Matveyeva 253 kg
Slivenko wins the title for the third time.

November 8, 2011 (Tuesday)

Cricket
West Indies in India:
1st Test in Delhi, day 3:  304 & 180 (57.3 overs; Ravichandran Ashwin 6/47);  209 & 152/2 (44 overs). India require another 124 runs with 8 wickets remaining.

Volleyball
FIVB Women's World Cup in Japan, Matchday 4:
 3–1 
 3–0 
 3–0 
 3–0 
 2–3 
 2–3 
Standings (after 4 matches): United States 12 points, Italy 11, China 9, Germany, Brazil 8, Japan, Serbia 7, Argentina 6, Dominican Republic 3, South Korea 1, Kenya, Algeria 0.

Weightlifting
World Championships in Paris, France:
Men's 69 kg:
Snatch:  Mete Binay  157 kg  Oleg Chen  156 kg  Tang Deshang  155 kg
Clean & Jerk:  Tang 186 kg  Wu Chao  185 kg  Won Jeong-Sik  182 kg
Total:  Tang 341 kg  Chen 336 kg  Wu 335 kg
Women's 63 kg:
Snatch:  Svetlana Tsarukayeva  117 kg (WR)  Ouyang Xiaofang  113 kg  Maiya Maneza  109 kg
Clean & Jerk:  Maneza 139 kg  Tsarukayeva 138 kg  Roxana Cocoş  136 kg
Total:  Tsarukayeva 255 kg  Maneza 248 kg  Ouyang 246 kg

November 7, 2011 (Monday)

Cricket
Pakistan vs Sri Lanka in UAE:
3rd Test in Sharjah, day 5:  413 & 181/6d (58 overs);  340 & 87/4 (57 overs). Match drawn; Pakistan win the 3-match series 1–0.
West Indies in India:
1st Test in Delhi, day 2:  304 (108.2 overs; Shivnarine Chanderpaul 118, Pragyan Ojha 6/72) & 21/2 (14 overs);  209 (52.5 overs). West Indies lead by 116 runs with 8 wickets remaining.

Surfing
Men's World Tour:
Rip Curl Search in San Francisco, United States: (1) Gabriel Medina  (2) Joel Parkinson  (3) Taylor Knox  & Alejo Muniz 
Standings (after 10 of 11 events): (1) Kelly Slater  63,350 points (2) Parkinson 48,600 (3) Owen Wright  47,900
Slater wins the title for the 11th time.

Weightlifting
World Championships in Paris, France:
Women's 58 kg:
Snatch:  Li Xueying  103 kg  Nastassia Novikava  101 kg  Romela Begaj  100 kg
Clean & Jerk:  Novikava 136 kg  Li 133 kg  Pimsiri Sirikaew  131 kg
Total:  Novikava 237 kg  Li 236 kg  Sirikaew 230 kg

November 6, 2011 (Sunday)

Athletics
World Marathon Majors:
New York City Marathon (KEN unless stated):
Men:  Geoffrey Mutai 2:05:06 (Course record)  Emmanuel Kipchirchir Mutai 2:06:28  Tsegaye Kebede  2:07:13
Women:  Firehiwot Dado  2:23:15  Bizunesh Deba  2:23:19  Mary Jepkosgei Keitany 2:23:38
Final World Marathon Majors standings:
Men: (1) Emmanuel Mutai 70 points (2) Geoffrey Mutai 65 (3) Patrick Makau Musyoki 60
Women: (1) Liliya Shobukhova  90 points (2) Edna Kiplagat 60 (3) Keitany 45

Auto racing
Sprint Cup Series – Chase for the Sprint Cup:
AAA Texas 500 in Fort Worth, Texas: (1)  Tony Stewart (Chevrolet; Stewart Haas Racing) (2)  Carl Edwards (Ford; Roush Fenway Racing) (3)  Kasey Kahne (Toyota; Red Bull Racing Team)
Drivers' championship standings (after 34 of 36 races): (1) Edwards 2316 points (2) Stewart 2313 (3)  Kevin Harvick (Chevrolet; Richard Childress Racing) 2283
World Touring Car Championship:
Race of China in Shanghai:
Race 1: (1) Alain Menu  (Chevrolet; Chevrolet Cruze) (2) Colin Turkington  (Wiechers-Sport; BMW 320 TC) (3) Robert Huff  (Chevrolet; Chevrolet Cruze)
Race 2: (1) Yvan Muller  (Chevrolet; Chevrolet Cruze) (2) Gabriele Tarquini  (Lukoil – SUNRED; SEAT León) (3) Huff
Drivers' championship standings (after 11 of 12 rounds): (1) Muller 400 points (2) Huff 380 (3) Menu 323

Badminton
World Junior Championships in Taipei, Chinese Taipei:
Boys singles: Zulfadli Zulkiffli  def. Viktor Axelsen  21–18, 9–21, 21–19
Girls singles: Ratchanok Inthanon  def. Elyzabeth Purwaningtyas  21–6, 18–21, 21–13
Boys doubles: Nelson Heg Wei Keat/Teo Ee Yi  def. Huang Po Jui/Lin Chia Yu  21–17, 21–17
Girls doubles: Lee So Hee/Shin Seung Chan  def. Shella Devi Aulia/Anggia Shitta Awanda  21–16, 13–21, 21–9
Mixed doubles: Alfian Eko Prasetya/Gloria Widjaja  def. Ronald Alexander/Tiara Rosalia Nuraidah  12–21, 21–17, 25–23

Baseball
Nippon Professional Baseball Climax Series:
Central League Final Stage, Game 5 in Nagoya: Chunichi Dragons 2, Tokyo Yakult Swallows 1. Dragons win series 4–2.
The Dragons advance to the Japan Series for the second successive year. Dragons starting pitcher Kazuki Yoshimi is named stage MVP.

Cricket
Pakistan vs Sri Lanka in UAE:
3rd Test in Sharjah, day 4:  413 & 164/5 (53.4 overs);  340 (138.2 overs; Chanaka Welegedara 5/87). Sri Lanka lead by 237 runs with 5 wickets remaining.
West Indies in India:
1st Test in Delhi, day 1:  256/5 (91 overs; Shivnarine Chanderpaul 111*); .

Cue sports
World Seniors Championship in Peterborough, England:
Quarter-finals:
Dene O'Kane  0–2 Steve Davis 
Darren Morgan  2–0 Cliff Thorburn 
Dennis Taylor  0–2 Jimmy White 
John Parrott  2–1 Karl Townsend 
Semi-finals:
Davis 2–0 Parrott
White 0–2 Morgan
Final: Davis 1–2 Morgan
Morgan wins the title for the first time.

Football (soccer)
CAF Champions League Final first leg: Wydad Casablanca  0–0  Espérance ST
 MLS Cup Playoffs Conference finals:
Eastern Conference: Sporting Kansas City 0–2 Houston Dynamo
Western Conference: Los Angeles Galaxy 3–1 Real Salt Lake
 Norwegian Cup Final in Oslo: Brann 1–2 Aalesund
Aalesund win the Cup for the second time.
 FAI Cup Final in Dublin: Shelbourne 1–1 (1–4 pen.) Sligo Rovers
Sligo Rovers win the Cup for the second successive time and fourth time overall.

Golf
World Golf Championships:
WGC-HSBC Champions in Shanghai, China:
Winner: Martin Kaymer  268 (−20)
Kaymer wins his tenth European Tour title.
LPGA Tour:
Mizuno Classic in Shima, Mie, Japan:
Winner: Momoko Ueda  200 (−16)PO
Ueda defeats Feng Shanshan  on the third playoff hole, to win her second LPGA Tour title.
Champions Tour:
Charles Schwab Cup Championship in San Francisco:
Winner: Jay Don Blake  276 (−8)
Blake wins his second Champions Tour title.

Motorcycle racing
Moto GP:
Valencian Grand Prix in Cheste, Spain:
MotoGP: (1) Casey Stoner  (Honda) (2) Ben Spies  (Yamaha) (3) Andrea Dovizioso  (Honda)
Final riders' championship standings: (1) Stoner 350 points (2) Jorge Lorenzo  (Yamaha) 260 (3) Dovizioso 228
Moto2: (1) Michele Pirro  (Moriwaki) (2) Mika Kallio  (Suter) (3) Dominique Aegerter  (Suter)
Final riders' championship standings: (1) Stefan Bradl  274 points (2) Marc Márquez  (Suter) 251 (3) Andrea Iannone  (Suter) 177
125cc (all ESP, Aprilia): (1) Maverick Viñales (2) Nicolás Terol (3) Héctor Faubel
Final riders' championship standings: (1) Terol 302 points (2) Johann Zarco  (Derbi) 262 (3) Viñales 248
Terol becomes the final 125cc World Champion.

Tennis
Fed Cup World Group Final in Moscow, day 2:  2–3 
Petra Kvitová  def. Svetlana Kuznetsova  4–6, 6–2, 6–3
Anastasia Pavlyuchenkova  def. Lucie Šafářová  6–2, 6–4
Lucie Hradecká/Květa Peschke  def. Maria Kirilenko/Elena Vesnina  6–4, 6–2
The Czech Republic win the title for the first time as a separate nation.
ATP World Tour:
Valencia Open 500 in Valencia, Spain:
Final: Marcel Granollers  def. Juan Mónaco  6–2, 4–6, 7–6(3)
Granollers wins his third ATP Tour title.
Swiss Indoors in Basel, Switzerland:
Final: Roger Federer  def. Kei Nishikori  6–1, 6–3
Federer wins the title for the fifth time in six years, and his 68th ATP Tour title overall.
WTA Tour:
Commonwealth Bank Tournament of Champions in Bali, Indonesia:
Final: Ana Ivanovic  def. Anabel Medina Garrigues  6–3, 6–0
Ivanovic defends her title, to win her eleventh WTA Tour title.

Volleyball
FIVB Women's World Cup in Japan, Matchday 3:
 0–3 
 3–1 
 3–2 
 1–3 
 1–3 
 3–0 
Standings (after 3 matches): United States 9 points, Italy 8, Argentina, Brazil, China, Germany, Serbia 6, Japan 4, Dominican Republic 3, South Korea, Algeria, Kenya 0.

Weightlifting
World Championships in Paris, France:
Men's 62 kg:
Snatch:  Kim Un-Guk  150 kg  Zhang Jie  145 kg  Bünyamin Sezer  141 kg
Clean & Jerk:  Zhang 176 kg  Eko Yuli Irawan  171 kg  Kim 170 kg
Total:  Zhang 321 kg  Kim 320 kg  Irawan 310 kg
Women's 53 kg:
Snatch:  Zulfiya Chinshanlo  97 kg  Yudelquis Contreras  95 kg  Hsu Shu-ching  93 kg
Clean & Jerk:  Chinshanlo 130 kg (WR)  Aylin Daşdelen  126 kg  Ji Jing  121 kg
Total:  Chinshanlo 227 kg  Daşdelen 219 kg  Ji 214 kg
Chinshanlo wins the title for the second time.

November 5, 2011 (Saturday)

Auto racing
Nationwide Series:
O'Reilly Auto Parts Challenge in Fort Worth, Texas: (1)  Trevor Bayne (Ford; Roush Fenway Racing) (2)  Denny Hamlin (Toyota; Joe Gibbs Racing) (3)  Carl Edwards (Ford; Roush Fenway Racing)
Drivers' championship standings (after 32 of 34 races): (1)  Ricky Stenhouse Jr. (Ford; Roush Fenway Racing) 1138 points (2)  Elliott Sadler (Chevrolet; Kevin Harvick Incorporated) 1121 (3)  Justin Allgaier (Chevrolet; Turner Motorsports) &  Aric Almirola (Chevrolet; JR Motorsports) 1039

Baseball
Nippon Professional Baseball Climax Series:
Central League Final Stage, Game 4 in Nagoya: Chunichi Dragons 5, Tokyo Yakult Swallows 1. Dragons lead series 3–2.
Pacific League Final Stage, Game 3 in Fukuoka: Fukuoka SoftBank Hawks 2, Saitama Seibu Lions 1 (F/12). Hawks win series 4–0.
The Hawks advance to the Japan Series for the first time since 2003. Hawks outfielder Seiichi Uchikawa is named stage MVP.

Cricket
New Zealand in Zimbabwe:
Only Test in Bulawayo, day 5:  426 & 252/8d;  313 & 331 (108.1 overs, Brendan Taylor 117, Doug Bracewell 5/85). New Zealand win by 34 runs.
Pakistan vs Sri Lanka in UAE:
3rd Test in Sharjah, day 3:  413;  282/6 (110 overs, Younis Khan 122). Pakistan trail by 131 runs with 4 wickets remaining in the 1st innings.

Cue sports
World Seniors Championship in Peterborough, England, last 16:
Tony Drago  1–2 Steve Davis 
Dene O'Kane  2–1 Neal Foulds 
Karl Townsend  2–0 Steve Ventham 
John Parrott  2–1 Joe Johnson 
Jimmy White  2–0 Tony Knowles 
Nigel Bond  0–2 Dennis Taylor 
Gary Wilkinson  0–2 Darren Morgan 
Cliff Thorburn  2–1 Doug Mountjoy

Equestrianism
Show jumping – World Cup, North American League East Coast:
7th competition in Lexington KY (CSI 4*-W):  Richard Spooner  on Cristallo  Nick Skelton  on Carlo  Jessica Springsteen  on Cincinnati

Figure skating
ISU Grand Prix:
Cup of China in Beijing, China:
Ice Dancing:  Ekaterina Bobrova/Dmitri Soloviev  163.52 points  Maia Shibutani/Alex Shibutani  148.40  Pernelle Carron/Lloyd Jones  130.97
Standings (after 3 of 6 events): Tessa Virtue/Scott Moir , Meryl Davis/Charlie White  & Bobrova/Soloviev 15 points (1 event), Nathalie Péchalat/Fabian Bourzat , Kaitlyn Weaver/Andrew Poje  & Shibutani/Shibutani 13 (1), Anna Cappellini/Luca Lanotte , Isabella Tobias/Deividas Stagniūnas  & Carron/Jones 11 (1).
Ladies:  Carolina Kostner  182.14 points  Mirai Nagasu  173.22  Adelina Sotnikova  159.95
Standings (after 3 of 6 events): Kostner 28 points (2 events), Nagasu 20 (2), Alissa Czisny  & Elizaveta Tuktamysheva  15 (1), Akiko Suzuki  13 (1), Viktoria Helgesson , Sotnikova & Ashley Wagner  11 (1).
Men:  Jeremy Abbott  228.49 points  Nobunari Oda  227.11  Song Nan  226.75
Standings (after 3 of 6 events): Kevin van der Perren  16 points (2 events), Patrick Chan , Abbott & Michal Březina  15 (1), Richard Dornbush  & Denis Ten  14 (2), Javier Fernández  & Oda 13 (1), Daisuke Takahashi , Song & Takahiko Kozuka  11 (1).
Pairs:  Yuko Kavaguti/Alexander Smirnov  186.74 points  Zhang Dan/Zhang Hao  177.67  Kirsten Moore-Towers/Dylan Moscovitch  172.04
Standings (after 3 of 6 events): Zhang/Zhang 26 points (2 events), Moore-Towers/Moscovitch 22 (2), Sui Wenjing/Han Cong  20 (2), Aliona Savchenko/Robin Szolkowy , Tatiana Volosozhar/Maxim Trankov  & Kavaguti/Smirnov 15 (1), Meagan Duhamel/Eric Radford  11 (1).

Football (soccer)
AFC Champions League Final in Jeonju, South Korea: Jeonbuk Hyundai Motors  2–2 (2–4 pen.)  Al-Sadd
Al-Sadd win the title for the second time, and qualify for the FIFA Club World Cup.
 Svenska Cupen Final in Helsingborg: Helsingborgs IF 3–1 Kalmar FF
Helsingborgs win the Cup for the fifth time.
 Higher League, matchday 32 (team in bold qualify for Champions League, teams in italics qualify for Europa League):
Gulbene 0–1 Liepājas
Ventspils 0–0 Skonto
Final standings: Ventspils 71 points, Liepājas 70, Daugava 63.
Ventspils win the title for the fourth time.

Horse racing
Breeders' Cup in Louisville, Kentucky (jockey, trainer, USA unless stated):
Marathon:  Afleet Again (Cornelio Velásquez , Robert Reid Jr.)  Birdrun  Giant Oak
Juvenile Turf:  Wrote (Ryan L. Moore , Aidan O'Brien )  Excaper  Farraaj
Dirt Sprint:  Amazombie (Mike E. Smith, Bill Spawr)  Force Freeze  Jackson Bend
Turf Sprint:  Regally Ready (Corey Nakatani, Steve Asmussen)  Country Day  Perfect Officer
Juvenile Dirt:  Caleb's Posse (Rajiv Maragh, Donnie Von Hemel)  Shackleford  Tres Borrachos
Turf Mile:  St Nicholas Abbey (Joseph O'Brien , Aidan O'Brien)  Sea Moon  Brilliant Speed
Dirt Mile:  Hansen (Ramon A. Dominguez , Michael J. Maker)  Union Rags  Creative Cause
Turf:  Court Vision (Robby Albarado, Dale L. Romans)  Turallure  Goldikova
Classic:  Drosselmeyer (Smith, William I. Mott)  Game On Dude  Ruler On Ice
Smith wins his 15th Breeders' Cup race, tying the record held by Jerry D. Bailey.

Korfball
World Championship in Shaoxing, China:
Bronze medal match:   33–16 
Final:   32–26  
The Netherlands win the title for the fifth successive time and eighth overall.

Mixed martial arts
UFC 138 in Birmingham, England:
Lightweight bout: Terry Etim  def. Eddie Faaloloto  via submission
Light Heavyweight bout: Anthony Perosh  def. Cyrille Diabaté  via submission
Welterweight bout: Thiago Alves  def. Papy Abedi  via submission
Bantamweight bout: Renan Barão  def. Brad Pickett  via submission
Middleweight bout: Mark Muñoz  def. Chris Leben  via TKO

Rugby league
Four Nations in England and Wales:
Round two in London (team in bold qualify for Final):
 0–36 
 20–36 
Standings (after 2 matches): Australia 4 points, England, New Zealand 2, Wales 0.
Autumn International Series in Limerick, Republic of Ireland:  16–34

Tennis
Fed Cup World Group Final in Moscow, day 1:  1–1 
Petra Kvitová  def. Maria Kirilenko  6–2, 6–2
Svetlana Kuznetsova  def. Lucie Šafářová  6–2, 6–3

Volleyball
FIVB Women's World Cup in Japan, Matchday 2:
 0–3 
 3–2 
 3–0 
 0–3 
 0–3 
 3–0 
Standings (after 2 matches): Germany, United States 6 points, Italy 5, China 4, Brazil, Dominican Republic, Japan, Serbia, Argentina 3, South Korea, Algeria, Kenya 0.

Weightlifting
World Championships in Paris, France:
Men's 56 kg:
Snatch:  Wu Jingbiao  133 kg  Zhao Chaojun  128 kg  Khalil El-Maaoui  127 kg
Clean & Jerk:  Wu 159 kg  Zhao 156 kg  Valentin Xristov  154 kg
Total:  Wu 292 kg  Zhao 284 kg  Xristov 276 kg
Wu wins the title for the second time.
Women's 48 kg:
Snatch:  Tian Yuan  90 kg  Genny Pagliaro  83 kg  Marzena Karpińska  82 kg
Clean & Jerk:  Tian 117 kg  Panida Khamsri  107 kg  Nurdan Karagöz  103 kg
Total:  Tian  207 kg  Khamsri 187 kg  Karagöz 183 kg

November 4, 2011 (Friday)

Baseball
Nippon Professional Baseball Climax Series:
Central League Final Stage, Game 3 in Nagoya: Tokyo Yakult Swallows 2, Chunichi Dragons 1. Series tied 2–2.
Pacific League Final Stage, Game 2 in Fukuoka: Fukuoka SoftBank Hawks 7, Saitama Seibu Lions 2. Hawks lead series 3–0.

Basketball
Euroleague Regular Season Matchday 3:
Group B: Panathinaikos  92–75  Žalgiris
Standings:  CSKA Moscow, Panathinaikos 3–0,  Unicaja 2–1,  Brose Baskets 1–2, Žalgiris,  KK Zagreb 0–3.

Cricket
New Zealand in Zimbabwe:
Only Test in Bulawayo, day 4:  426 & 252/8d (71 overs; Kyle Jarvis 5/64);  313 & 61/2 (23.4 overs). Zimbabwe require another 305 runs with 8 wickets remaining.
Pakistan vs Sri Lanka in UAE:
3rd Test in Sharjah, day 2:  413 (153.3 overs; Kumar Sangakkara 144);  35/2 (20 overs). Pakistan trail by 378 runs with 8 wickets remaining in the 1st innings.

Cycling (track)
Track Cycling World: Astana
Women's Team Sprint: (1) , (2) , (3)
Men's Scratch Race: (1) ,  (2) ,  (3) 
Women's Team Pursuit: (1)  (Ellen van Dijk, Kirsten Wild, Amy Pieters) (2)  (Fan Jiang, Wenwen Jiang, Jing Liang), (3)  (Lisa Brennauer, Charlotte Becker, Madeleine Sandig)
Men's Team Sprint: (1) , (2) , (3)
Women's 500m Time Trial: (1) ,  (2) , (3) 
Women's Points Race: (1) , (2) , (3) 
Men's Team Pursuit: (1)  (Team RVL), (2) , (3)

Horse racing
Breeders' Cup in Louisville, Kentucky (jockey, trainer, USA unless stated otherwise):
Juvenile Sprint:  Secret Circle (Rafael Bejarano , Bob Baffert)  Shumoos  Holdin Bullets
Juvenile Fillies Turf:  Stephanie's Kitten (John R. Velazquez , Wayne M. Catalano)  Stopshoppingmaria  Sweet Cat
Filly & Mare Sprint:  Musical Romance (Juan Leyva , William Kaplan)  Switch  Her Smile
Juvenile Fillies Dirt:  My Miss Aurelia (Corey Nakatani, Steve Asmussen)  Grace Hall  Weemissfrankie
Filly & Mare Turf:  Perfect Shirl (Velazquez, Roger Attfield )  Nahrain  Misty For Me
Ladies' Classic:  Royal Delta (Jose Lezcano , William I. Mott)  It's Tricky  Pachattack

Volleyball
FIVB Women's World Cup in Japan, Matchday 1:
 3–0 
 1–3 
 3–1 
 3–0 
 0–3 
 3–1

November 3, 2011 (Thursday)

Baseball
Nippon Professional Baseball Climax Series:
Central League Final Stage, Game 2 in Nagoya: Tokyo Yakult Swallows 3, Chunichi Dragons 1. Dragons lead series 2–1.
Pacific League Final Stage, Game 1 in Fukuoka: Fukuoka SoftBank Hawks 4, Saitama Seibu Lions 2. Hawks lead series 2–0.

Basketball
Euroleague Regular Season Matchday 3:
Group A:
Fenerbahçe Ülker  90–86  SLUC Nancy
Bennet Cantù  78–69  Bizkaia Bilbao
Standings:  Caja Laboral 3–0, Bennet Cantù 2–1, SLUC Nancy, Fenerbahçe Ülker, Bizkaia Bilbao,  Olympiacos 1–2.
Group B: Brose Baskets  78–79  Unicaja
Standings:  CSKA Moscow 3–0,  Panathinaikos 2–0, Unicaja 2–1, Brose Baskets 1–2,  Žalgiris Kaunas 0–2,  KK Zagreb 0–3.
Group C:
Partizan Mt:s Belgrade  91–81  Spirou Charleroi
EA7 Emporio Armani  54–62  Anadolu Efes
Maccabi Tel Aviv  88–82  Real Madrid
Standings: Real Madrid, Anadolu Efes, Maccabi Tel Aviv 2–1, Partizan Mt:s Belgrade, EA7 Emporio Armani, Spirou Charleroi 1–2.
Group D: UNICS Kazan  65–93  FC Barcelona Regal
Standings: FC Barcelona Regal,  Montepaschi Siena 3–0, FC Barcelona Regal 2–0,  Galatasaray Medical Park, UNICS Kazan,  Union Olimpija Ljubljana 1–2,  Asseco Prokom Gdynia 0–3.

Cricket
New Zealand in Zimbabwe:
Only Test in Bulawayo, day 3:  426 & 28/2 (7 overs);  313 (121.5 overs; Daniel Vettori 5/70). New Zealand lead by 141 runs with 8 wickets remaining.
Pakistan vs Sri Lanka in UAE:
3rd Test in Sharjah, day 1:  245/2 (86 overs; Kumar Sangakkara 112*); .
Other news: Pakistan cricketers Salman Butt, Mohammad Asif and Mohammad Amir are jailed for between 6 and 30 months after being found guilty of conspiracy to cheat and conspiracy to accept corrupt payments, in relation to spot-fixing during the fourth Test against England, at Lord's in August 2010.

Football (soccer)
UEFA Europa League group stage Matchday 4 (teams in bold qualify for Round of 32):
Group A:
Rubin Kazan  1–0  Tottenham Hotspur
Shamrock Rovers  1–3  P.A.O.K.
Standings (after 4 matches): P.A.O.K. 8 points, Rubin Kazan, Tottenham Hotspur 7, Shamrock Rovers 0.
Group B:
Vorskla Poltava  1–3  Standard Liège
Copenhagen  1–2  Hannover 96
Standings (after 4 matches): Standard Liège, Hannover 96 8 points, Copenhagen 4, Vorskla Poltava 1.
Group C:
Legia Warsaw  3–1  Rapid București
PSV Eindhoven  3–3  Hapoel Tel Aviv
Standings (after 4 matches): PSV Eindhoven 10 points, Legia Warsaw 9, Rapid București 3, Hapoel Tel Aviv 1.
Group D:
Vaslui  1–0  Sporting CP
Lazio  1–0  Zürich
Standings (after 4 matches): Sporting CP 9 points, Lazio, Vaslui 5, Zürich 2.
Group E:
Maccabi Tel Aviv  1–2  Stoke City
Beşiktaş  1–0  Dynamo Kyiv
Standings (after 4 matches): Stoke City 10 points, Beşiktaş 6, Dynamo Kyiv 5, Maccabi Tel Aviv 1.
Group F:
Red Bull Salzburg  0–1  Athletic Bilbao
Paris Saint-Germain  1–0  Slovan Bratislava
Standings (after 4 matches): Athletic Bilbao 10 points, Paris Saint-Germain 7, Red Bull Salzburg 4, Slovan Bratislava 1.
Group G:
Metalist Kharkiv  3–1  Malmö FF
Austria Wien  2–2  AZ
Standings (after 4 matches): Metalist Kharkiv 10 points, AZ 6, Austria Wien 5, Malmö FF 0.
Group H:
Braga  5–1  Maribor
Birmingham City  2–2  Club Brugge
Standings (after 4 matches): Braga, Club Brugge, Birmingham City 7 points, Maribor 1.
Group I:
Celtic  3–1  Rennes
Atlético Madrid  4–0  Udinese
Standings (after 4 matches): Atlético Madrid, Udinese 7 points, Celtic 5, Rennes 2.
Group J:
Schalke 04  0–0  AEK Larnaca
Steaua București  4–2  Maccabi Haifa
Standings (after 4 matches): Schalke 04 8 points, Maccabi Haifa 6, Steaua București 5, AEK Larnaca 2.
Group K:
Twente  3–2  Odense
Fulham  4–1  Wisła Kraków
Standings (after 4 matches): Twente 10 points, Fulham 7, Odense, Wisła Kraków 3.
Group L:
AEK Athens  1–3  Lokomotiv Moscow
Anderlecht  3–0  Sturm Graz
Standings (after 4 matches): Anderlecht 12 points, Lokomotiv Moscow 9, Sturm Graz 3, AEK Athens 0.
Copa Sudamericana Quarterfinals first leg:
Arsenal  1–2  Universidad de Chile
LDU Quito  1–0  Libertad
UEFA Women's Champions League Round of 16 first leg:
Sparta Praha  0–6  Olympique Lyon
FC Energy Voronezh  0–4  WFC Rossiyanka
Rayo Vallecano  1–1  Arsenal
 MLS Cup Playoffs Conference Semifinals, second leg (first leg scores in parentheses):
Eastern Conference: Houston Dynamo 1–0 (2–1) Philadelphia Union. Houston Dynamo win 3–1 on aggregate.
Western Conference: Los Angeles Galaxy 2–1 (1–0) New York Red Bulls. Los Angeles Galaxy win 3–1 on aggregate.

Snowboarding
World Cup in Saas-Fee, Switzerland:
Men's Halfpipe:  Yuri Podladchikov  95.3 points  Ryō Aono  91.3  Janne Korpi  87.0
Halfpipe standings (after 2 of 5 events): (1) Korpi 1600 points (2) Aono 1040 (3) Podladchikov 1000
Freestyle overall standings: (1) Korpi 2600 points (2) Dimi de Jong  1220 (3) Aono 1040
Women's Halfpipe:  Queralt Castellet  87.0 points  Sophie Rodriguez  75.3  Ursina Haller  75.0
Halfpipe standings (after 2 of 5 events) & Freestyle overall standings: (1) Haller 1200 points (2) Castellet 1180 (3) Cai Xuetong  1000

November 2, 2011 (Wednesday)

Baseball
Nippon Professional Baseball Climax Series:
Central League Final Stage, Game 1 in Nagoya: Chunichi Dragons 2, Tokyo Yakult Swallows 1. Dragons lead series 2–0.

Basketball
Euroleague Regular Season Matchday 3:
Group A: Caja Laboral  81–79  Olympiacos
Standings: Caja Laboral 3–0,  SLUC Nancy,  Bizkaia Bilbao,  Bennet Cantù 1–1, Olympiacos 1–2,  Fenerbahçe Ülker 0–2.
Group B: KK Zagreb  47–89  CSKA Moscow
Standings: CSKA Moscow 3–0,  Panathinaikos 2–0,  Brose Baskets,  Unicaja 1–1,  Žalgiris Kaunas 0–2, KK Zagreb 0–3.
Group D:
Montepaschi Siena  103–77  Galatasaray Medical Park
Union Olimpija Ljubljana  70–62  Asseco Prokom Gdynia
Standings: Montepaschi Siena 3–0,  FC Barcelona Regal 2–0,  UNICS Kazan 1–1, Galatasaray Medical Park, Union Olimpija Ljubljana 1–2, Asseco Prokom Gdynia 0–3.

Cricket
West Indies in Bangladesh:
2nd Test in Dhaka, day 5:  355 & 383/5d;  231 & 278 (80.2 overs, Devendra Bishoo 5/90). West Indies win by 229 runs; win 2-match series 1–0.
New Zealand in Zimbabwe:
Only Test in Bulawayo, day 2:  426 (143.3 overs);  82/1 (40 overs). Zimbabwe trail by 344 runs with 9 wickets remaining in the 1st innings.

Football (soccer)
UEFA Champions League group stage Matchday 4 (teams in bold qualify for Round of 16):
Group A:
Bayern Munich  3–2  Napoli
Villarreal  0–3  Manchester City
Standings (after 4 matches): Bayern Munich 10 points, Manchester City 7, Napoli 5, Villarreal 0.
Group B:
Trabzonspor  0–0  CSKA Moscow
Internazionale  2–1  Lille
Standings (after 4 matches): Internazionale 9 points, CSKA Moscow, Trabzonspor 5, Lille 2.
Group C:
Manchester United  2–0  Oțelul Galați
Benfica  1–1  Basel
Standings (after 4 matches): Manchester United, Benfica 8 points, Basel 5, Oțelul Galați 0.
Group D:
Lyon  0–2  Real Madrid
Ajax  4–0  Dinamo Zagreb
Standings (after 4 matches): Real Madrid 12 points, Ajax 7, Lyon 4, Dinamo Zagreb 0.
Copa Sudamericana Quarterfinals first leg: Universitario  2–0  Vasco da Gama
UEFA Women's Champions League Round of 16 first leg:
1. FFC Frankfurt  3–0  Paris Saint-Germain
Turbine Potsdam  10–0  Glasgow City
Brøndby IF  2–1  Torres
SV Neulengbach  1–3  LdB Malmö
Fortuna Hjørring  0–1  Göteborg FC
 MLS Cup Playoffs Conference Semifinals, second leg (first leg scores in parentheses):
Eastern Conference: Sporting Kansas City 2–0 (2–0) Colorado Rapids. Sporting Kansas City win 4–0 on aggregate.
Western Conference: Seattle Sounders FC 2–0 (0–3) Real Salt Lake. Real Salt Lake win 3–2 on aggregate.

November 1, 2011 (Tuesday)

Cricket
West Indies in Bangladesh:
2nd Test in Dhaka, day 4:  355 & 383/5d (111.3 overs; Darren Bravo 195);  231 & 164/3 (47 overs). Bangladesh require another 344 runs with 7 wickets remaining.
New Zealand in Zimbabwe:
Only Test in Bulawayo, day 1:  275/3 (90 overs; Martin Guptill 109); .

Football (soccer)
UEFA Champions League group stage Matchday 4 (teams in bold qualify for Round of 16):
Group E:
Valencia  3–1  Bayer Leverkusen
Genk  1–1  Chelsea
Standings (after 4 matches): Chelsea 8 points, Bayer Leverkusen 6, Valencia 5, Genk 2.
Group F:
Arsenal  0–0  Marseille
Borussia Dortmund  1–0  Olympiacos
Standings (after 4 matches): Arsenal 8 points, Marseille 7, Borussia Dortmund 4, Olympiacos 3.
Group G:
Zenit St. Petersburg  1–0  Shakhtar Donetsk
APOEL  2–1  Porto
Standings (after 4 matches): APOEL 8 points, Zenit St. Petersburg 7, Porto 4, Shakhtar Donetsk 2.
Group H:
BATE Borisov  1–1  Milan
Viktoria Plzeň  0–4  Barcelona
Standings (after 4 matches): Barcelona 10 points, Milan 8, BATE Borisov 2, Viktoria Plzeň 1.
Copa Sudamericana Quarterfinals first leg: Santa Fe  1–1  Vélez Sársfield
 Meistriliiga, matchday 35 (team in bold qualify for Champions League, teams in italics qualify for Europa League): Flora 4–0 Viljandi
Standings: Flora 83 points, Kalju 79, Trans 73.
Flora win the title for the ninth time.

Horse racing
Melbourne Cup in Melbourne:  Dunaden (jockey: Christophe Lemaire , trainer: Mikel Delzangles)  Red Cadeaux  Lucas Cranach

References

XI